= Mass media in Tulsa, Oklahoma =

This is a summary of mass communications media in Tulsa, Oklahoma.

== Radio ==
Tulsa is the 65th largest radio market in the country. The following is a partial list of radio stations serving the Tulsa area.

=== FM ===
- 88.1 KTUA Coweta (Air1)
- 88.7 KWTU Tulsa (Classical)
- 89.1 KKLB Bartlesville (K-Love)
- 89.5 KWGS Tulsa (Public radio/NPR/talk)
- 90.5 KNYD Broken Arrow (Christian)
- 90.9 KOKT-LP Tulsa (Community/variety)
- 91.3 KRSC-FM Claremore (College/variety/Rogers State University)
- 92.1 KTBT Broken Arrow (Contemporary hit radio)
- 92.9 KRQV Tulsa (Classic hits)
- 94.1 KXOJ-FM Glenpool (Christian adult contemporary)
- 95.5 KWEN Tulsa (Country music)
- 96.5 KRMG-FM Sand Springs (Talk radio-KRMG simulcast)
- 97.1 KYAL-FM Muskogee (Sports/ESPN)
- 97.5 KMOD-FM Tulsa (Active rock)
- 98.5 KVOO-FM Henryetta (Country music)
- 99.5 KXBL Tulsa (Classic country)
- 100.1 KYFM Bartlesville (Adult contemporary)
- 100.9 KTSO Sapulpa (Soft oldies)
- 101.5 KIZS Collinsville (Regional Mexican)
- 102.3 KRAV-FM Tulsa (Hot adult contemporary)
- 102.9 KPIM-LP Broken Arrow (Catholic radio)
- 103.3 KRHZ Tulsa (Classic rock)
- 104.5 KMYZ-FM Pryor (Alternative rock)
- 105.3 KJMM Bixby (Urban contemporary music)
- 106.1 KTGX Owasso (Country music)
- 106.9 KHTT Muskogee (Contemporary hit radio)
- 107.5 KOSN Ketchum (Public radio/NPR/talk)

=== AM ===
- 740 KRMG Tulsa (Talk radio)
- 970 KCFO Tulsa (Christian and conservative talk)
- 1050 KGTO Tulsa (Urban adult contemporary)
- 1170 KOTV Tulsa (News on 6 Now)
- 1270 KRXO Claremore (Spanish CHR)
- 1300 KAKC Tulsa (Conservative talk)
- 1340 KJMU Sand Springs (Urban gospel)
- 1380 KMUS Sperry (Spanish CHR and talk)
- 1430 KTBZ Tulsa (Sports/FSR)
- 1530 KXTD Wagoner (Regional Mexican)
- 1550 KYAL Sapulpa (Sports/ESPN-KYAL-FM simulcast)

== Television ==
Tulsa is the 58th largest TV market in the United States (as ranked by Nielsen and Arbitron).

=== Full-power ===
- 2 KJRH-TV Tulsa (NBC)
- 6 KOTV-DT Tulsa (CBS)
- 8 KTUL Tulsa (ABC, Fox on 8.2)
- 11 KOED-TV Tulsa (OETA/PBS)
- 17 KDOR-TV Bartlesville (TBN)
- 19 KQCW-DT Muskogee (The CW)
- 23 KOKI-TV Tulsa (Roar)
- 35 KRSU-TV Claremore (Educational independent)
- 41 KMYT-TV Tulsa (Independent with MyNetworkTV)
- 44 KTPX-TV Okmulgee (Ion Television)
- 47 KWHB Tulsa (CTN)
- 53 KGEB Tulsa (GEB Network)

=== Low-power ===
- 10 K30OK-D Tulsa (HSN)
- 14 KXAP-LD Tulsa (Estrella TV)
- 22 KTUO-LD Tulsa (Heartland)
- 25 KUTU-CD Tulsa (Univision, UniMás on 25.2, Telemundo on 25.3)
- 29 KTZT-CD Tulsa (Daystar)
- 39 KZLL-LD Tulsa
- 40 K27OB-D Tulsa (3ABN)
- 48 KUOC-LD Enid

== Newspapers ==
Tulsa's leading newspaper is the daily Tulsa World, the second most widely circulated newspaper in Oklahoma (after The Oklahoman) with a 2006 Sunday circulation of 189,789. Urban Tulsa, another large publication, is a weekly newspaper covering entertainment and cultural events. Covering primarily economic events and stocks, the Tulsa Business Journal caters to Tulsa's business sector. Other publications include the Oklahoma Indian Times, the Tulsa Daily Commerce and Legal News, the Tulsa Beacon, This Land Press, and the Tulsa Free Press. Until 1992, the Tulsa Tribune served as a daily major newspaper competing with the Tulsa World. The paper was acquired by the Tulsa World that year.

== Cinema ==
Feature films shot in the Tulsa region include the Francis Ford Coppola productions The Outsiders and Rumble Fish (both released in 1983), as well as "Weird Al" Yankovic's UHF (1989), Tulsa (1949), All-American Murder (1992), The Frighteners (1996), Phenomenon (1996), Keys to Tulsa (1997), and Tim Blake Nelson's Eye of God (1997).

== See also ==
- Oklahoma media
  - List of newspapers in Oklahoma
  - List of radio stations in Oklahoma
  - List of television stations in Oklahoma
  - Media of locales in Oklahoma: Broken Arrow, Lawton, Norman, Oklahoma City
