= KVOO =

KVOO may refer to:

- KVOO-FM, a radio station (98.5 FM) licensed to Tulsa, Oklahoma, United States
- KJRH-TV, a television station (channel 2) which used the call sign KVOO until 1971
- KOTV (AM), a radio station (1170 AM) licensed to Tulsa, Oklahoma, United States, which used the call sign KVOO until May 2002
