= Pierce Block =

- U.S. National Register of Historic Places
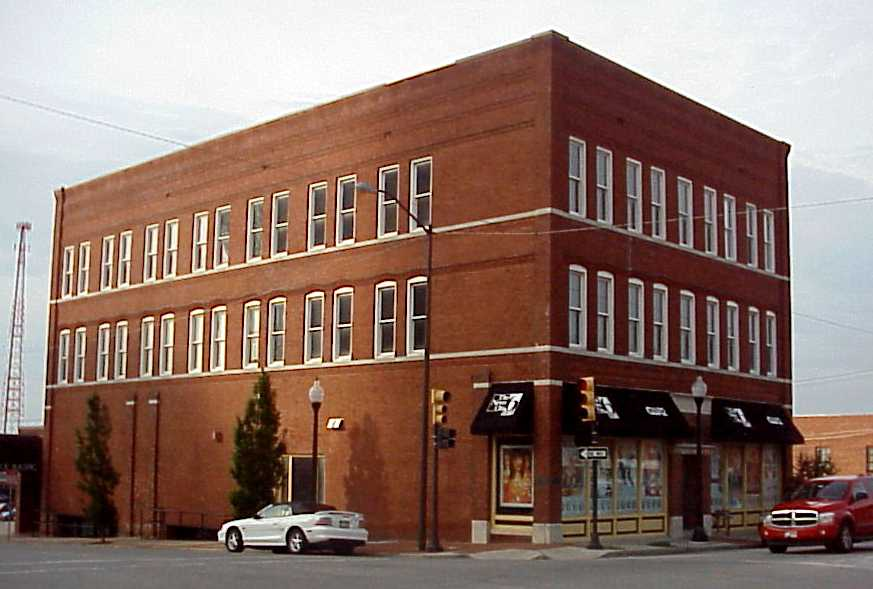
- Pierce Block
- Location: 301 E. 3rd St., Tulsa, OK
- Coordinates: 36.15493°N 95.98746°W
- Built: 1908–1909
- Architectural style: Plains Commercial
- NRHP reference No.: 79002033

The Pierce Block is a historic building in downtown Tulsa, Oklahoma on the northeast corner of Third Street and Detroit Avenue, that was constructed as a hotel in 1909. According to the Tulsa Preservation Commission, it is the oldest remaining post-statehood hotel in Tulsa. Originally it was a few blocks west of the Midland Valley Railroad passenger station, which was at Third and Greenwood Avenue.

== Building design and use ==
The building architecture is Plains Commercial style. According to the National Register of Historic Places (NRHP) application, it was used continuously as a hotel for seventy years. The hotel was on the second and third floors. The ground floor was largely devoted to retail space and housed the Mammoth Credit Company clothing store until 1929. The Midland Valley station was closed and subsequently demolished after all passenger railroad services transferred to the Union Depot in 1931.

Building tenants included primarily a succession of printing companies after 1948. Later, the retail space was occupied successively by a paint and wallpaper store, a vending machine company and a billiard parlor. From 2005 to 2013, it contained the sales offices of KOTV and KQCW television, owned by Griffin Communications; KOTV's Tulsa studios were not large enough to house the entire operation until new facilities were completed in 2013. Mimosa Tree Capital Partners acquired the Pierce Block in late 2012, shortly before Griffin vacated the premises.

The building is a utilitarian design, with a painted brick exterior. The ground level has store-front windows with clerestories (which have since been enclosed), and a recessed entrance with a single door and fanlight for the hotel. Over the doorway is a stone inscribed "Pierce Block 1909". A stone string visually divides the first and second floors. The second story has nine arched windows, while the third story has rectangular windows that are defined by horizontal bands. Horizontal brick bands create a false front for the flat roof. The Detroit Avenue elevation has two openings, a freight door and a store display window (now covered with boards.

The Pierce Block is the second oldest structure in Tulsa listed on the National Register of Historic Places (the oldest being the Dawson School). Its NRIS number is 79002033.
