= Jim Giles (meteorologist) =

American television meteorologist (1930–2006)

Jim Giles (1939 – December 20, 2006) was a longtime television meteorologist with CBS affiliate KOTV, Channel 6 in Tulsa, Oklahoma. A "longtime fixture" on Oklahoma television, after his death the Tulsa World described him as "perhaps the best-known weatherman in this area".

== Career ==
Giles began his career in 1961. Upon graduation from Ball State University, he was commissioned as an officer in the United States Air Force. While in the Air Force, he served as the commander of the Nha Trang weather station in Vietnam during the Vietnam War and spent three years at the Severe Storms Forecast Center in Kansas City, Missouri. It was during those years that development began on Doppler weather radar. He taught meteorology and worked in broadcasting in Austin and Dallas before joining KOTV in 1981 as chief meteorologist.

== Giles' Coats for Kids ==
Since 1986, Giles has spearheaded the Giles' Coats For Kids Campaign, which provided warm winter coats for Oklahomans who would otherwise do without. As of his retirement over 200,000 coats had been donated.

== Retirement and death ==
On November 22, 2006, Giles retired from KOTV after 25 years. In his final interview, Giles said he wanted to be remembered for "just doing a good job." After his retirement, Giles began a business venture selling steel safe rooms of his own design as storm shelters for the tornado-prone Tulsa area, but a few weeks later, on December 20, 2006, he died after battling a series of health problems.

== Legacy ==
In 2007, Giles was posthumously inducted into the Oklahoma Association of Broadcasters Hall of Fame. In the same year, the University of Oklahoma (where he received a master's degree) named a classroom after Giles. Also in 2007, a small park area on Rhema Bible Church's property was dedicated to him.

The Giles Coats for Kids program continues, with thousands of coats being donated each year. Giles' wife, Hannah, continued the partnership with Bennett Steel, Inc. to sell Jim Giles Safe Rooms, which are designed to withstand an F5 tornado. On December 31, 2014, the company closed its doors, citing an "increasingly competitive market".
