= KHTT =

Radio station in Muskogee, Oklahoma

- Muskogee, Oklahoma; United States
- Broadcast area: Tulsa metropolitan area
- Frequency: 106.9 MHz (HD Radio)
- Branding: 106.9 K-Hits

Programming
- Format: Top 40 (CHR)
- Subchannels: HD2: News on 6 Now

Ownership
- Owner: Griffin Media; (Griffin Licensing, L.L.C.)
- Sister stations: Radio: KRQV; KVOO-FM; KXBL; KOTV; TV: KOTV-DT; KQCW-DT

History
- First air date: February 1972
- Former call signs: KMMM (1972–1982); KAYI (1982–1993)
- Call sign meaning: K-HiTs Tulsa

Technical information
- Licensing authority: FCC
- Facility ID: 55704
- Class: C0
- ERP: 74,500 watts
- HAAT: 388.4 meters (1,274 ft)
- Transmitter coordinates: 35.861°N 95.768°W

Links
- Public license information: Public file; LMS
- Website: www.khits.com

KHTT (106.9 FM, "106.9 K-HITS") is a top 40 mainstream (CHR) radio station licensed to Muskogee, Oklahoma, United States, and serving the Tulsa metropolitan area. It is owned by Griffin Media with studios in Downtown Tulsa.

KHTT has an effective radiated power (ERP) of 74,500 watts. The transmitter is off South 186th East Avenue in Bixby. KHTT broadcasts using HD Radio technology. The HD-2 subchannel carries the audio simulcast of KOTV's 6.3 subchannel, which is also heard on co-owned KOTV 1170 AM.

== History ==
=== Country, MOR and Urban ===
106.9 K-HITS logo used until 2016.

The station signed on the air in February 1972. Its original call sign was KMMM, known as "K-Triple M" (the three Ms in its call letters standing for "Muskogee's Music Machine"). At times it was called "The New K107 FM". At first, it played a mix of middle of the road and country music. It was an affiliate of the ABC Entertainment Network.

One of the later formats for the station was urban contemporary. The station mixed in a few top 40 songs during the daytime and aired a straight ahead Urban presentation by evenings. By 1982 KMMM went dark.

=== Top 40 ===
Later in 1982, the station came back on the air with an upgrade in its signal now allowing it to target the more lucrative Tulsa radio market. It changed its format to mainstream Top 40/CHR and changed its call letters to KAYI. But it still kept the moniker "K107 FM" and later as "NorthWay 107 FM".

In January 1992, KAYI evolved in an Adult CHR direction, but the change did not bring success. In November 1993, the station changed its call letters to KHTT and its slogan to "K-HITS." It remained an adult-leaning top 40 station for a few more years. Then in the summer of 1996, "K-HITS" shifted back to a more mainstream top 40 format, which it has to this day.

=== Ownership changes ===
In April 1988, Renda Broadcasting of Pittsburgh purchased then KAYI-FM (K107) from the ill-fated Narragansett Broadcasting Company of Rhode Island. Shortly after the deal closed, Renda moved its existing Tulsa station, then AC KBEZ into the same facility as K107.

On March 8, 2012, Renda announced that it was selling KHTT and KBEZ to Journal Communications for $11.8 million. The deal closed on June 25, 2012. Both KHTT and KBEZ moved into the Journal Communications facility at 29th and Yale Avenue adjacent to the Broken Arrow Expressway joining the existing Journal stations KVOO, KXBL, and KFAQ after residing at 7030 S Yale, Suite 711 for nearly 30 years.

Journal Communications (KHTT's former owner) and the E. W. Scripps Company (owner of NBC's local affiliate KJRH-TV) announced on July 30, 2014 that the two companies would merge to create a new broadcast company under the E. W. Scripps Company name that will own the two companies' broadcast properties, including KHTT. The transaction was approved.

On June 25, 2018, parent company E. W. Scripps announced that it would sell KHTT - along with its sister stations, KBEZ, KFAQ, KVOO, and KXBL to Griffin Communications. Griffin began operating the stations under a local marketing agreement on July 30, and completed the purchase October 1; the company already owned CBS affiliate KOTV-DT and CW affiliate KQCW-DT.

=== Gunman ===
On January 13, 2010, just after 1 pm, 58-year-old Barry Styles brought a gun to the offices of KHTT and sister station KBEZ (now KRQV). He walked up and down the hallways demanding to speak to KBEZ morning show DJ Carly Rush. When the receptionist informed the man she had left for the day, he walked out of the office then immediately returned brandishing a pistol.

The receptionist escaped to the back of the office and called the Tulsa Police Department. The gunman trapped the employees inside the office and guarded the exit. After approximately 10 minutes, the police department had arrived on scene. When the gunman refused to drop his weapon, police fired three shots, hitting him in the waist once. Shortly after, the police handcuffed the man and he was taken to a hospital.
