= KXBL =

Radio station in Tulsa, Oklahoma

- Tulsa, Oklahoma; United States
- Broadcast area: Tulsa metropolitan area
- Frequency: 98.5 MHz (HD Radio)
- Branding: 98.5 The Bull

Programming
- Format: Country
- Subchannels: HD2: News on 6 Now

Ownership
- Owner: Griffin Media; (Griffin Licensing, L.L.C.)
- Sister stations: Radio: KHTT; KOTV; KRQV; KVOO-FM; TV: KOTV-DT; KQCW-DT

History
- First air date: November 16, 1973
- Former call signs: KBJH (1973–1976); KCFO-FM (1976–1987); KUSO (1987–1988); KVOO-FM (1988–2026)
- Call sign meaning: The Bull

Technical information
- Licensing authority: FCC
- Facility ID: 68330
- Class: C
- ERP: 100,000 watts
- HAAT: 374 meters (1,227 ft)
- Transmitter coordinates: 36°11′26″N 96°05′50″W

Links
- Public license information: Public file; LMS
- Webcast: Listen live
- Website: www.thebulltulsa.com

KXBL (98.5 MHz) is a commercial radio station in Tulsa, Oklahoma, United States. The station is owned by Griffin Media and it airs a country music radio format. In 1988, the FM station picked up the heritage KVOO-FM call sign and country format from its AM sister station (now KOTV). The studios are on North Boston Avenue in downtown Tulsa.

KXBL has an effective radiated power (ERP) of 100,000 watts, the maximum for most stations in the U.S. The transmitter is on Oklahoma State Highway 97 in the Osage Reservation, north of Sand Springs, Oklahoma. KXBL is licensed by the FCC to broadcast in the HD Radio format.

== History ==
The station first signed on the air on November 16, 1973. Its call letters were KBJH, and it aired a Christian radio format. The station was started by evangelist Billy James Hargis and his initials were part of the call sign. The station's license was held by the American Christian College, founded by Hargis.

In 1976, the call letters were changed to KCFO-FM. The station called itself "Love 98 FM" and it played Contemporary Christian music. Salem Communications owned KCFO AM-FM at that time. It decided to focus on large and major markets and sold KCFO-FM to the Stuart family in 1987. The Stuarts also owned KVOO 1170 AM, which was a full service country station, with personalities, news and sports. KCFO-FM flipped to a more-music country sound, first as KUSO "US-98.5" and later as "Country 98" KVOO-FM, using the same call letters as the heritage AM station. The Stuart family sold the stations to Great Empire Broadcasting in 1990.

Journal Communications (KVOO-FM's former owner) and The E.W. Scripps Company (owner of Tulsa's NBC network affiliate KJRH-TV) announced on July 30, 2014, that the two companies would merge to create a new broadcast company under the E.W. Scripps Company name. The new firm would own the two companies' broadcast properties, including KVOO-FM.

On June 25, 2018, parent company E.W. Scripps announced that it would sell KVOO, along with its sister stations, KBEZ, KFAQ, KHTT, and KXBL, to Griffin Communications. Griffin began operating the stations under a local marketing agreement (LMA) on July 30, and completed the purchase October 1. The company already owned CBS affiliate KOTV-DT and CW affiliate KQCW-DT.

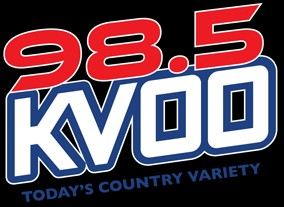
Logo as "98.5 KVOO"

On December 7, 2020, at Noon, KVOO-FM rebranded as "98.5 The Bull".

On January 5, 2026, KVOO-FM changed their call letters to KXBL, swapping call letters with KXBL 99.5 FM, which took the KVOO-FM call letters.
