= KVOO-FM =

Radio station in Henryetta, Oklahoma

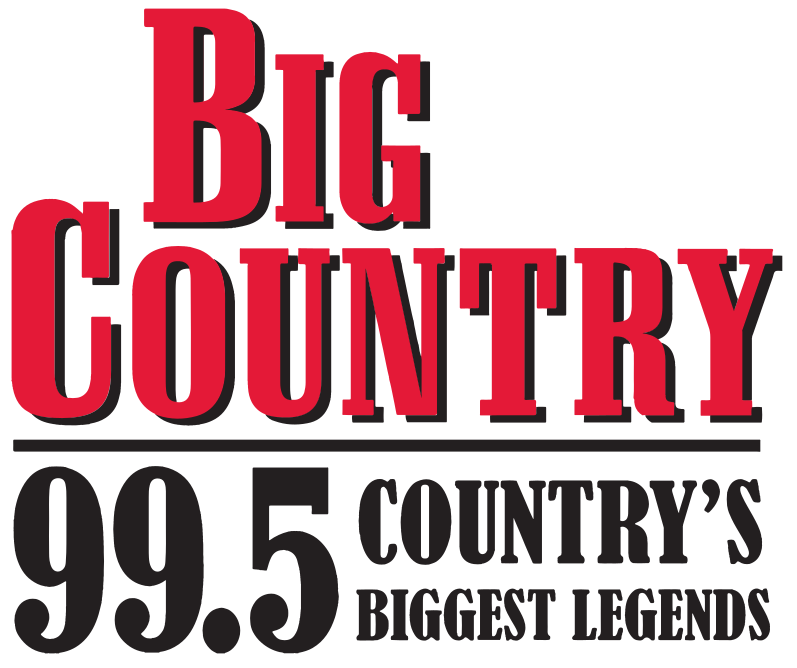
- Henryetta, Oklahoma; United States
- Broadcast area: Tulsa metropolitan area
- Frequency: 99.5 MHz (HD Radio)
- Branding: Big Country 99.5

Programming
- Format: Classic country
- Subchannels: HD2: News on 6 Now
- Affiliations: Compass Media Networks

Ownership
- Owner: Griffin Media; (Griffin Licensing, L.L.C.)
- Sister stations: Radio: KHTT; KOTV; KRQV; KXBL; TV: KOTV-DT; KQCW-DT

History
- First air date: October 20, 1966
- Former call signs: KHEN-FM (1966–1981); KQMJ (1981–1991); KSTM (1991–1993); KCKI (1993–2001); KXBL (2001–2026)
- Call sign meaning: Voice of Oklahoma

Technical information
- Licensing authority: FCC
- Facility ID: 68331
- Class: C1
- ERP: 100,000 watts
- HAAT: 299 meters (981 ft)
- Transmitter coordinates: 35°50′02″N 96°07′28″W

Links
- Public license information: Public file; LMS
- Webcast: Listen live
- Website: bigcountry995.com

KVOO-FM (99.5 FM "Big Country 99.5") is a commercial radio station licensed to Henryetta, Oklahoma, United States, and serving the Tulsa metropolitan area. It is owned by Griffin Media and it airs a classic country radio format. On Sunday mornings, it plays Southern Gospel music. The studios are on North Boston Avenue, near Interstate 244 in Downtown Tulsa.

KXBL has an effective radiated power (ERP) of 100,000 watts, the maximum for most FM stations in the U.S. It shares a tower with television station KTPX-TV on Belcher Road in Mounds, Oklahoma. KBXL broadcasts in the HD Radio hybrid format.

== History ==
=== Early years ===
The station signed on the air on October 20, 1966. Its original call sign was KHEN-FM, the sister station to KHEN 1590 AM (now dark) owned by the Henryetta Broadcasting Company. The two stations mostly simulcast their programming. Because 1590 KHEN was a daytimer station, 99.5 KHEN-FM continued the station's programming into the evening. KHEN-AM-FM played mostly middle of the road (MOR) music, with local news and sports. They were affiliates of the ABC Information Network.

In the 1970s and 1980s, 99.5 FM was known as KGCG "The Green Country Giant." It later became KDLB "Double Barrel Country" (both as country music stations). It later went dark, then came back on the air in 1985. At that time, it was "Magic 99" KQMJ. In 1991, it became "99.5 The Storm" with the call sign KSTM. KSTM returned to country music in March 1993 and changed its call letters to KCKI as "Kick 99".

=== The Bull and Big Country ===
It changed its call sign in 2001 to KXBL and became "99.5 The Bull". In 2003, KXBL became a classic country station as "Big Country 99.5," its current format. It plays country hits mostly from the 1970s, 80s and 90s.

The moniker "Big Country" had been used by 1170 KVOO (now KOTV) for much of its run as Tulsa's popular AM country station. Management decided to call KXBL "Big Country" to remind country music fans that 99.5 FM is playing many of the songs that became popular on 1170 KVOO.

=== Changes in ownership ===
In 1999, KXBL was acquired by Journal Communications. On July 30, 2014, Journal Communications and the E. W. Scripps Company (owner of NBC's local affiliate KJRH-TV) announced that the two companies would merge. They would create a new broadcast company under the E. W. Scripps name that will own the two companies' broadcast properties, including KXBL. The transaction was completed in 2015, with shareholder and regulatory approvals.

On June 25, 2018, parent company E. W. Scripps announced that it would sell KXBL, along with its sister stations, KBEZ, KFAQ, KHTT and KVOO to Griffin Communications. Griffin began operating the stations under a local marketing agreement (LMA) on July 30, and completed the purchase October 1. The company already owned CBS affiliate KOTV-DT and CW affiliate KQCW-DT.

KXBL originated a daily midday program with country music star and area native Joe Diffie, which aired until his death. The program was recorded from Nashville and from his tour stops.

On January 5, 2026, KXBL changed their call letters to KVOO-FM, swapping call letters with KVOO-FM 98.5 FM Tulsa.
