= Griffin Media =

Media company in Oklahoma

Griffin Media, LLC
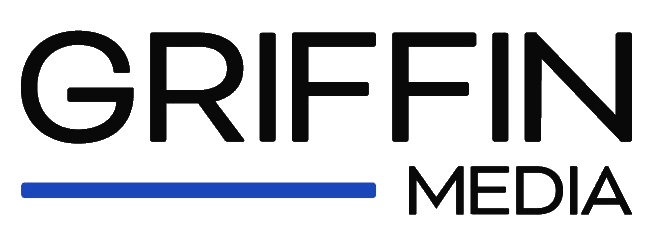
- Formerly: Oklahoma Television Corporation; Griffin-Leake Television; Griffin Television; Griffin Communications, LLC
- Type: Private; Limited Liability Company
- Founded: September 5, 1951; 74 years ago
- Founders: John Toole Griffin; James C. "Jimmy" Leake
- Headquarters: Oklahoma City, Oklahoma, United States
- Key people: David F. Griffin (President/CEO)
- Products: Broadcasting
- Owners: David F. Griffin; Kirsten Griffin; John W. Griffin
- Parent: Griffin Food Company
- Divisions: Broadcasting; New Media; Tower Construction; Outdoor Advertising
- Website: www.griffin.news

Griffin Media is an American media company based in Oklahoma City, Oklahoma. The company began as a subsidiary of Muskogee-based Griffin Foods, which produces a line of pancake and waffle syrups and other foods.

It owns Oklahoma's two large CBS affiliates, KWTV-DT in Oklahoma City and KOTV-DT in Tulsa, and duopoly partners in each of those markets, MyNetworkTV outlet KSBI-TV in Oklahoma City and The CW outlet KQCW-DT in Tulsa. It also owns five radio stations in Tulsa.

== History ==
=== Early history ===
John Toole "J. T." Griffin – the owner and president of the Griffin Grocery Company, a Muskogee-based wholesaler and manufacturer of condiments and baking products that he inherited from his father, John Taylor Griffin, after the elder company co-founder died in 1944 – entered the communications industry in October 1938, when he purchased local radio station KOMA (1520 AM, now KOKC) from Hearst Radio for $315,000. Griffin would eventually become interested in television broadcasting around 1950, after noticing during one of his commutes that many homes in the Oklahoma City area had installed outdoor antennas to receive the signal of primary NBC affiliate WKY-TV (channel 4, now KFOR-TV), the first television station ever to sign on in Oklahoma, which began operation on June 6, 1949. John decided to extend the family business deeper into broadcasting, gathering together several additional backers – including his brother-in-law, James C. "Jimmy" Leake – to finance the development of and apply for licenses to operate television stations in Oklahoma City, Muskogee, and Little Rock, Arkansas.

On September 5, 1951, the Oklahoma Television Corporation—a consortium led by Griffin (who, along with sister Marjory Griffin Leake and brother-in-law James C. Leake, became the company's majority owners in July 1952, with a collective 92.7% controlling interest) and investors that included former Oklahoma Governor Roy J. Turner, company executive vice president Edgar T. Bell (who would later serve as channel 9's first general manager), and Video Independent Theatres president Henry Griffing (who acted as a trustee on behalf of the regional movie theater operator)—filed an application for a construction permit to build and license to operate a television station on VHF channel 9. On June 27, 1952, KOMA Inc., a licensee corporation of KOMA radio that was largely owned by Griffin and the Leakes, filed a separate application. The Oklahoma Television Corporation was eventually granted the license on July 22, 1953, after the company struck an agreement with KOMA Inc. days before to merge their bids, in exchange for KOMA purchasing 50% of the shares in the former that were owned by Oklahoma Television's original principal investors. (Under FCC procedure, the Commission's Broadcast Bureau board decided on license proposals filed by "survivor" applicants at the next scheduled meeting following the withdrawal of a competing bid.) Instead of using the KOMA calls assigned to the radio station, the Griffin group chose instead to request KWTV (for "World's Tallest Video") as the television station's call letters, in reference to the transmission tower being constructed behind its studio facility (which was also under construction at the time) on a plot of land on Northeast 74th Street and North Kelley Avenue that KOMA had purchased in 1950, with the intention of developing it for a television broadcast facility. (KOMA would vacate its facilities at the now-demolished Biltmore Hotel in downtown Oklahoma City once the Kelley Avenue building was completed.)

On December 15, 1953 (five days before KWTV's sign-on), the Griffin-Leake partnership launched their first television station, ABC affiliate KATV in Little Rock. On December 20, 1953, KWTV signed on channel 9 as a CBS affiliate, named for its tall transmitter tower (which did not actually go into use until 1954). Griffin also owned two other television stations in partnership with Leake. The first of these was KATV in Little Rock, which came to air the day before KWTV in 1953. the group would later On September 18, 1954, the company signed on its third television station, ABC affiliate KTVX in Muskogee. Within five years of its sign-on, KTVX began to relocate its city of license and operations to Tulsa; after the move to Lookout Mountain was completed, Griffin–Leake's Tulsa station changed its call letters to KTUL, after its co-owned radio station. In 1956, the two sold their radio assets.

=== Sole ownership by the Griffin family ===
In November 1963, the Griffin-Leake interests purchased Turner and Dulaney's 25% interests in KWTV for $200,000 and title rights to the equipment used by KWTV, KTUL and KATV. Turner and Dulaney would then sell the equipment, valued at $2.3 million, to First National Bank of Oklahoma City executives C.A. Voss and James Kite for $3 million. Griffin-Leake's Oklahoma stations would then be folded into KATV parent licensee KATV Inc. (subsequently rechristened as Griffin-Leake TV), which would enter into a ten-year, $4.5 million (or $37,500 per month) agreement with Voss and Kite to lease the equipment. Griffin and the Leakes would own approximately all of the common voting stock and collectively own 84% of nonvoting common shares in KATV Inc. post-merger, with 10% of the remaining nonvoting interest held by Edgar Bell (who would remain KWTV's executive vice president and general manager).

In April 1969, Griffin-Leake TV announced that it would split into two separate companies. Griffin retained ownership of KWTV under the rechristened Griffin Television Inc. (which was renamed Griffin Communications in 2000), while Leake retained ownership of KATV, KTUL, Ponca City-based cable television operator Cable TV Co. and a controlling 80% interest in the construction permit for Fajardo, Puerto Rico television station WSTE (now WORO-DT) through the spin-off Leake TV, Inc. (Leake's stations were later sold to Allbritton Communications and are now part of Sinclair Broadcast Group.) Ownership of KWTV would transfer to the familial heirs of John Griffin – widow Martha Watson Griffin (who also assumed her husband's post as KWTV board chairman), and sons John W. and David Griffin (both of whom would become KWTV executives in 1990, with David taking over as Griffin Communications's president in 2001) – after he died on July 26, 1985, at the age of 62.

Post-split from Leake, Griffin expanded its television holdings again in the 1980s; it first bought KPOM-TV (now Fox affiliate KFTA-TV) in Fort Smith from Ozark Broadcasting Co. in September 1985. To solve longstanding reception difficulties the station faced, it later signed on a satellite station in Rogers, KFAA (now KNWA-TV), in October 1989 to relay the signal of KPOM – both of which were owned by the Griffins until 2004, when it sold the NBC affiliates to the Nexstar Broadcasting Group – into Fayetteville and areas of northwest Arkansas not covered by the parent signal. From 1992 to 2004, under Griffin ownership, KPOM/KFAA were the company's only television properties that did not have a local news operation.

The company eventually announced intentions to re-enter the Tulsa market, on December 3, 1996, when Griffin Television launched News Now 53, a local cable news channel originally developed in partnership with Cox Communications (which only served Oklahoma City proper and Forest Park at the time) and Multimedia Cablevision (which then served the remainder of suburban Oklahoma City, including Midwest City, Bethany, Yukon and Edmond) that primarily aired simulcasts of KWTV's morning, midday and evening newscasts as well as rolling repeats of the station's most recently aired newscast. (During its early years, News Now 53 also occasionally aired sports and special event programs exclusive to the channel or which had originally aired on channel 9.) The service's creation traces to a contractual clause that Griffin included in retransmission consent agreements it reached with Cox and Multimedia in August 1993. Initially available exclusively on Cox's Oklahoma City system, Multimedia began carrying News Now 53 on its suburban area systems (which, in January 2000, were sold to Cox by the Gannett Company) on January 6, 1997. The Cox/Griffin partnership launched a feed for the Tulsa area – offering newscasts from KOTV – in May 2001 on the former local TCI systems that Cox acquired eleven months prior. Since then, Griffin has expanded and invested in its Tulsa holdings, eventually constructing a new a 50,000-square-foot (4,645 m^{2}) media center on North Boston Avenue and East Cameron Street in downtown Tulsa's Brady Arts District (renamed the Tulsa Arts District in September 2017) to house KOTV and its sister properties, which opened on January 19, 2013. (Some archival material in the former building on South Frankfort Avenue – including news footage, specials and still photographs dating to the 1950s – was donated to the Oklahoma Historical Society.)

In 2005, Griffin acquired the Radio Oklahoma Network, a statewide radio syndication service that distributes news, KOTV and KWTV-provided weather content, sports, and commodities reports to radio stations across the state; the network was moved into Griffin's Oklahoma City facilities in 2007 and 2008. On October 8, 2005, Griffin purchased Muskogee-licensed WB affiliate KWBT (channel 19, now CW affiliate KQCW-DT) from Spokane, Washington-based Cascade Broadcasting Group for $33.5 million ($26.8 million for the non-license assets and $6.7 million for the license itself). Under the terms of the deal, Griffin assumed responsibility for KWBT's advertising sales and administrative operations under a local marketing agreement that continued until the sale's closure. When the deal was finalized on September 29, 2005, KOTV and KWBT became the fourth commercial television station duopoly in the Tulsa market. KWBT subsequently migrated its operations from its studio facility in Yukon, into KOTV's Frankfort Avenue studios on December 6 of that year.

In 2007, Griffin New Media was established to manage the Griffin station websites, and later, social media. In 2009, Griffin and Oklahoma City-based OETA flagship KETA-TV (channel 13) decommissioned the original KWTV transmission tower due to the analog-to-digital transition. By 2013, it was announced that the tower would be dismantled in 2014, with the top piece being donated to the Oklahoma Broadcast Museum.

On September 29, 2014, Griffin Communications announced that it would acquire MyNetworkTV affiliate KSBI (channel 52) from Oklahoma City-based Family Broadcasting Group. (Griffin had previously submitted a bid to acquire KSBI in 2001, only to be beaten by a competing offer by Family Broadcasting predecessor Christian Media Group.) In addition to maintaining some separate programming as well as syndicated programs shared with KWTV, KSBI also serves as an alternate carrier of CBS network programming in the event that extended breaking news or severe weather coverage requires KWTV to pre-empt it (taking over this responsibility from News 9 Now).

On June 25, 2018, Griffin and the E. W. Scripps Company announced that Griffin would acquire Scripps's Tulsa radio cluster – KFAQ (1170 AM), KVOO-FM (98.5), KBEZ (92.9 FM), Muskogee-licensed KHTT (106.9 FM) and Henryetta-licensed KXBL-FM (99.5) – for $12.5 million. The purchase marks Griffin's entry into radio station ownership, even though the company has owned the Radio Oklahoma Network syndicated news service since 2005; the sale would also put the stations under the ownership of KOTV-DT/KQCW-DT, both competitors to Scripps-owned NBC affiliate KJRH-TV (channel 2), which that company retained. Griffin began operating the radio stations under a local marketing agreement on July 30, and completed the purchase that October.

== Current stations ==
- (**) – built and signed-on by Griffin Communications or its predecessors.

=== Television ===
City of license / market	Station	Channel	Owned since	Network affiliation
Oklahoma City, OK	KWTV-DT **	9	1953	CBS
Oklahoma City, OK	KSBI	52	2014	MyNetworkTV
Tulsa, OK	KOTV-DT	6	2000	CBS
Tulsa, OK	KQCW-DT	19	2005	The CW

=== Radio ===
AM Station	FM Station

City of license / Market	Station	Owned since	Station format
Tulsa, OK	KOTV 1170	2018	News radio
Tulsa, OK	KRQV 92.9	2018	Classic hits
Tulsa, OK	KHTT 106.9	2018	Contemporary hit radio
Tulsa, OK	KXBL 98.5	2018	Country
Tulsa, OK	KVOO-FM 99.5	2018	Classic Country

== Former stations ==
- Stations are arranged in alphabetical order by state and city of license.
- Two boldface asterisks appearing following a station's call letters (**) indicate a station built and signed on by Griffin Media.

Media market	State	Station	Purchased	Sold	Notes
Fayetteville–Rogers	Arkansas	KFAA-TV	1989	2004	(Note: Not related to the present-day KFAA-TV that serves the Dallas–Fort Worth metroplex, but is licensed to Decatur, Texas.)
Fort Smith	Arkansas	KPOM-TV **	1985	2004	
Little Rock	Arkansas	KATV **	1954	1968	
Tulsa	Oklahoma	KTUL **	1954	1968	
