= KOTV (AM) =

Radio station in Tulsa, Oklahoma

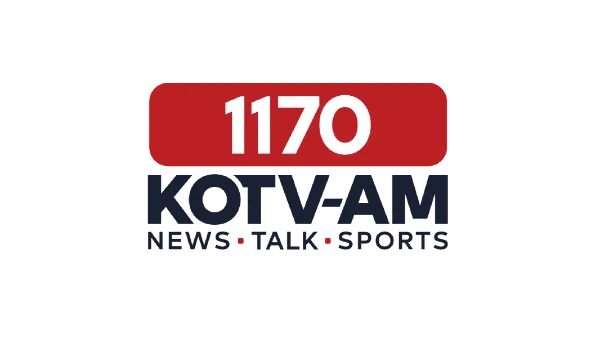
- Tulsa, Oklahoma; United States
- Broadcast area: Tulsa metropolitan area
- Frequency: 1170 kHz (HD Radio)
- Branding: 1170 News on 6 Now

Programming
- Format: All-News (KOTV local newscasts)
- Affiliations: Oklahoma State Cowboys and Cowgirls

Ownership
- Owner: Griffin Media; (Griffin Licensing, L.L.C.)
- Sister stations: Radio: KHTT; KRQV; KVOO-FM; KXBL; TV: KOTV-DT; KQCW-DT

History
- First air date: June 23, 1926
- Former call signs: KVOO (1926–2002); KFAQ (2002–2021); KTSB (2021–2024)
- Call sign meaning: Derived from KOTV

Technical information
- Licensing authority: FCC
- Facility ID: 68329
- Class: A
- Power: 50,000 watts
- Transmitter coordinates: 36°8′47.35″N 95°48′26.95″W
- Repeaters: 99.5 KVOO-HD2 (Henryetta); 98.5 KXBL-HD2 (Tulsa); 106.9 KHTT-HD2 (Muskogee)

Links
- Public license information: Public file; LMS
- Website: newson6.com/news-on-6-now

KOTV (1170 AM, "News on 6 Now") is a commercial radio station licensed to Tulsa, Oklahoma, United States. Owned by Griffin Media, it airs an all-news format as a simulcast of KOTV-DT's local newscasts. Studios are located across from Guthrie Green in Downtown Tulsa, and the transmitter is sited in East Tulsa.

KOTV is a clear channel Class A station broadcasting at 50,000 watts, the maximum power for American AM stations. The station uses a non-directional antenna by day, heard over much of Eastern Oklahoma and parts of Kansas, Arkansas and Missouri. It provides secondary coverage as far north as Wichita, as far east as Fayetteville and Fort Smith, Arkansas. At night, it uses a directional antenna with a three-tower array to protect the other Class A station on 1170 AM, WWVA in Wheeling, West Virginia. Even with this restriction, KOTV's nighttime signal can be heard over much of the Central United States and well into the Rocky Mountains with a good radio.

KOTV is also the Tulsa affiliate of the Cowboy Radio Network, with live game broadcasts of Oklahoma State Cowboys football, Oklahoma State Cowboys basketball, and Oklahoma State Cowgirls basketball.

== History ==
=== Station founding ===
Founded by E. H. Rollestone, KOTV first signed on the air on June 23, 1926. Its original call sign was KVOO, the "Voice Of Oklahoma". At the time, it was powered at 1,000 watts with its transmitter in Bristow, Oklahoma. Rollestone, a young oil millionaire, had previously founded another station in Bristow known as KFRU, which had already been sold to Stephens College in Columbia, Missouri.

KVOO was moved to Tulsa on September 13, 1927, after being partially purchased by William G. Skelly. Skelly later purchased the entire company on June 28, 1928. In 1933, radio legend Paul Harvey began his radio career at KVOO.

=== Country music heritage ===
From the 1970s until May 2002, the station was primarily known for its country music heritage, as well as being nationally famous for Western swing music. KVOO hosted such musicians as Bob Wills and his Texas Playboys, Johnnie Lee Wills and Billy Parker, who has won awards as country music disc jockey of the year. KVOO began live broadcasts of Bob Wills concerts in 1934; those concerts moved to Cain's Ballroom in 1935.

In addition, KVOO hosted The John Chick Show, a full hour of local country music talent, also seen on KTUL (channel 8) until 1979. This program broadcast at 7 a.m., and regularly beat out NBC's Today Show and the CBS Morning News in the local ratings. KTUL's network, ABC, had no morning news program until 1975; when ABC premiered Good Morning America, KTUL continued to air the Chick program instead. When Elton Rule, president of ABC, visited KTUL-TV to see why the ABC affiliate was pre-empting Good Morning America, Jimmy C. Leake, owner of KTUL-TV, showed the Tulsa ratings book to Rule, and ABC backed off. KTUL began carrying Good Morning America in 1979, when Chick left the station due to multiple sclerosis.

=== Noted DJs and performers ===
In 1971, Billy Parker joined KVOO. While at the station, Parker's awards included the Country Music Association Disc Jockey of the Year honor in 1974 and the Academy of Country Music Disc Jockey of the Year awards in 1975, 1977, 1978 and 1984. Parker was inducted into the Country Music Disc Jockey Hall of Fame in 1992, the Western Swing Hall of Fame in 1993, and scored the Oklahoma Association of Broadcasters' Lifetime Achievement Award in 1995.

The Interstate Road Show was also hosted on the station by veteran country DJ Larry Scott who is also in the Country Music Disc Jockey Hall of Fame. The last live country show was broadcast by veteran Tulsa radio personality Bob O'Shea. O'Shea first worked at KVOO in 1979. He later rejoined KVOO in August 1999 and retired on June 26, 2006, after more than 34 years in radio. The last three songs O'Shea played were "Hello Out There" by Billy Parker, "T-U-L-S-A, Straight Ahead" by Ray Benson & Asleep at the Wheel and "Take Me Back To Tulsa" by Bob Wills and The Texas Playboys.

=== KVOO-TV and KVOO-FM ===
The NBC television affiliate in Tulsa went on the air as KVOO-TV (channel 2) on December 5, 1954. Both KVOO-TV and KVOO radio shared the same building for many years. In 1970, KVOO sold off the television station to Scripps-Howard Broadcasting (now the E. W. Scripps Company). As separately-owned broadcast stations could not share call signs at the time, the TV station's call letters became KTEW. In 1980, KTEW became KJRH-TV.

In 1987, KVOO acquired an FM station, KCFO-FM, which aired Christian contemporary music. At the time, KVOO had plenty of disc jockey chatter and information, in addition to playing the country hits. Management flipped KCFO-FM to be a more-music FM country outlet, to contrast with KVOO on the AM dial, as KUSO, "US-98.5". Later, it became "Country 98" KVOO-FM, using the same call letters as the heritage AM station. The Stuart family sold KVOO-AM-FM to Great Empire Broadcasting in 1990.

=== Switch to talk ===
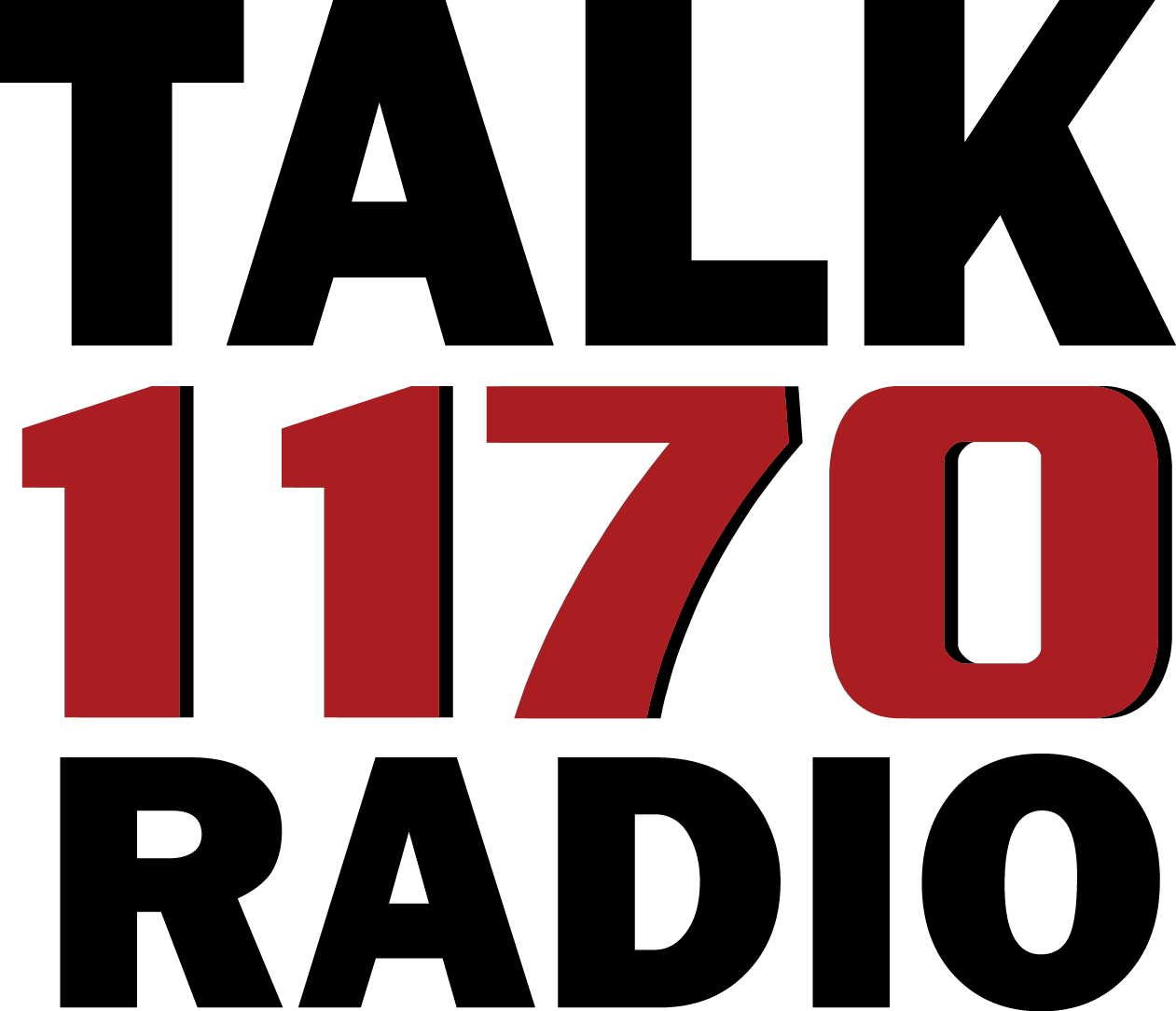
Logo as "Talk Radio 1170"

At midnight on May 15, 2002, the country music ended. KVOO changed to KFAQ with a talk radio format. Most of the DJs moved to co-owned 98.5 KVOO-FM and that station added more classic country. In 2003, co-owned KXBL flipped to all-classic country music, playing many of the same songs KVOO AM aired in previous decades. KXBL calls itself "Big Country", the same slogan KVOO AM used when it was at its height.

Journal Media Group announced on July 30, 2014, that it would merge with Scripps. Scripps would retain the two firms' broadcasting properties, including KFAQ; this reunited the station with KJRH-TV.

=== Griffin Communications ownership ===
Logo as "The Blitz"

On June 25, 2018, Scripps announced that it would sell its Tulsa radio stations, including KFAQ, to Oklahoma City-based Griffin Communications for $12.5 million. The sale would make the radio stations co-owned with CBS affiliate KOTV-DT (channel 6) and CW affiliate KQCW-DT (channel 19), both competitors to KJRH. Griffin began operating the stations under a local marketing agreement on July 30, and completed the purchase October 1. On September 7, 2021, the station flipped to sports radio as "1170 The Blitz", carrying a mix of local programming and Fox Sports Radio. The call letters were changed to KTSB, representing "Tulsa's Sports Blitz."

On June 26, 2024, citing low ratings, the "Blitz" format was dropped. The station then began airing an audio simulcast of KOTV-DT's "News on 6 Now" subchannel. This was coupled with a call sign change to KOTV, to match the call letters on the co-owned television station.
