= KRQV =

Radio station in Tulsa, Oklahoma

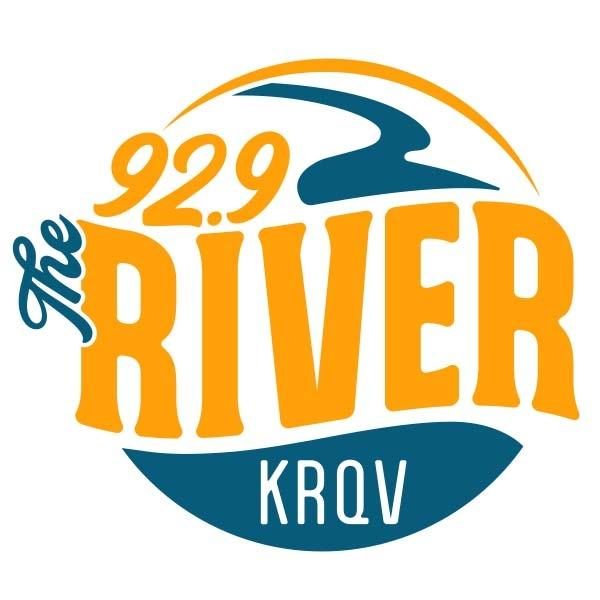
- Tulsa, Oklahoma; United States
- Broadcast area: Tulsa metropolitan area
- Frequency: 92.9 MHz
- Branding: 92.9 The River

Programming
- Format: Classic hits

Ownership
- Owner: Griffin Media; (Griffin Licensing, L.L.C.)
- Sister stations: Radio: KHTT; KVOO-FM; KXBL; KOTV; TV: KOTV-DT; KQCW-DT

History
- First air date: March 1964 (as KAKC-FM)
- Former call signs: KOGM-FM (1959–1963); KAKC-FM (1963–1977); KBEZ (1977–2023)

Technical information
- Licensing authority: FCC
- Facility ID: 55707
- Class: C0
- ERP: 100,000 watts
- HAAT: 402 meters (1,319 ft)
- Transmitter coordinates: 36.191°N 96.097°W

Links
- Public license information: Public file; LMS
- Webcast: Listen live
- Website: www.929theriver.com

KRQV (92.9 FM, "92.9 The River") is a commercial radio station in Tulsa, Oklahoma, United States, airing a classic hits format. It is owned by Griffin Media with studios on North Boston Avenue in Downtown Tulsa.

KRQV has an effective radiated power (ERP) of 100,000 watts. The transmitter tower is off Oklahoma State Highway 97 in the Osage Reservation in Sand Springs, Oklahoma.

== History ==
92.9 KBEZ logo used until 2010.

=== KAKC-FM and KBEZ ===
The station signed on the air in March 1964. The original call sign was KAKC-FM, and was the FM sister station to KAKC (970 AM, now KCFO). At first, it simulcast the AM station's programming. By Summer 1977, it was airing an easy listening format, taking the call sign KBEZ, with the last two call letters signifying "Easy." Over time, the number of instrumental easy songs decreased and the soft vocals increased, moving the station to a soft adult contemporary music format.

==== Gunman ====
On January 13, 2010, just after 1 pm, 58-year-old Barry Styles came to KBEZ's and KHTT's offices and studios, and walked up and down the hallways demanding to speak to morning show co-host Carly Rush. When the receptionist informed the man she had left for the day, he walked out of the office, then immediately returned brandishing a pistol. The receptionist escaped to the back of the office and called the Tulsa Police Department.

The gunman trapped several employees inside the office and guarded the exit. After approximately ten minutes, police arrived on scene. When the gunman refused to drop his weapon, police fired three, shots, hitting him in the waist once. Shortly after, the police handcuffed the man and he was taken to a hospital where he was listed as being in serious condition. No employees were hurt.

=== Bob FM/The Drive ===
At noon on June 10, 2010, KBEZ dropped its longtime adult contemporary format and adopted an adult hits format as "92.9 BOB FM". The last song on KBEZ was "Goodbye Yellow Brick Road" by Elton John; the first song on Bob FM was "I Gotta Feeling" by The Black Eyed Peas.

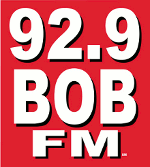
92.9 BOB FM logo used from 2010 to 2013.

At noon on September 9, 2013, KBEZ shifted to classic hits, while retaining the "Bob FM" moniker. The station later dropped most music from the 1960s to concentrate on the 1970s and 1980s, as well as some 1990s hits, using the slogan "Tulsa's Greatest Hits."

On August 1, 2017, KBEZ rebranded as "92.9 The Drive".

=== KRQV ===
On September 4, 2023, at midnight, the station rebranded as "92.9 The River", and shifted to a more standard classic hits format compared to the classic rock lean it carried as "The Drive". The first song on The River was "Always Something There to Remind Me" by Naked Eyes. The following day, the station took on the new call sign KRQV, retiring the KBEZ call sign after 46 years.

Cliff and Carly Mornings started on September 18, 2023. It was the first change in the station's morning show in 15 years.

=== Ownership changes ===
On March 8, 2012, Renda Broadcasting announced that it was selling KHTT and KRQV to Journal Communications for $11.8 million. The deal closed on June 25, 2012. Both KHTT and its sister KBEZ moved into the Journal Communications facility at 29th and Yale Avenue adjacent to the Broken Arrow Expressway joining the existing Journal stations KVOO, KXBL, and KFAQ.

Journal Communications (KRQV's former owner) and the E. W. Scripps Company (owner of Tulsa's NBC network affiliate KJRH-TV) announced on July 30, 2014 that the two companies would merge to create a new broadcast company under the E. W. Scripps Company name that would own the two companies' broadcast properties, including KBEZ.

On June 25, 2018, parent company E. W. Scripps announced that it would sell KBEZ - along with its sister stations, KFAQ, KHTT, KVOO, and KXBL to Griffin Communications. Griffin began operating the stations under a local marketing agreement on July 30, and completed the purchase on October 1, at a price of $12.5 million; the company already owned CBS affiliate KOTV-DT and CW affiliate KQCW-DT.

== Previous logos ==
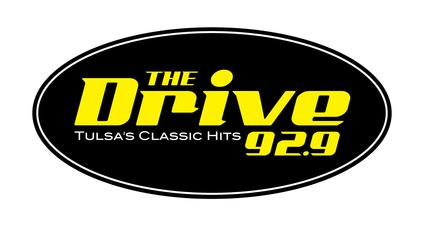
