= KJRH-TV =

Television station in Tulsa, Oklahoma

- Tulsa, Oklahoma; United States
- Channels: Digital: 8 (VHF); Virtual: 2
- Branding: 2 News Oklahoma

Programming
- Affiliations: 2.1: NBC; for others, see § Subchannels

Ownership
- Owner: E. W. Scripps Company; (Scripps Broadcasting Holdings LLC)
- Sister stations: KTPX-TV

History
- First air date: December 5, 1954
- Former call signs: KVOO-TV (1954–1971); KTEW (1971–1980); KJRH (1980–2010)
- Former channel numbers: Analog: 2 (VHF, 1954–2009); Digital: 56 (UHF, 2001–2009)
- Call sign meaning: Jack R. Howard, longtime chairman of Scripps Broadcasting

Technical information
- Licensing authority: FCC
- Facility ID: 59439
- ERP: 15.9 kW; 24 kW (CP)
- HAAT: 572.3 m (1,878 ft)
- Transmitter coordinates: 36°1′15″N 95°40′33″W
- Translator(s): KTPX-TV 44.2 Okmulgee

Links
- Public license information: Public file; LMS
- Website: www.kjrh.com

KJRH-TV (channel 2) is a television station in Tulsa, Oklahoma, United States, affiliated with NBC. It is owned by the E. W. Scripps Company alongside Okmulgee-licensed Ion Television outlet KTPX-TV (channel 44). KJRH-TV's studios are located on South Peoria Avenue and East 37th Street in midtown Tulsa, and its transmitter is located near South 273rd East Avenue near Broken Arrow.

== History ==
=== Early history under Central Plains Enterprises ===
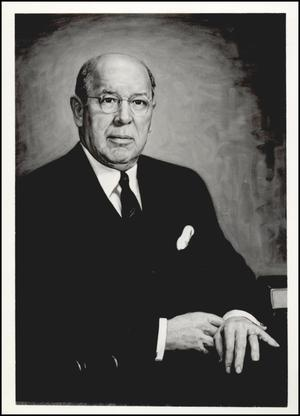
William G. Skelly, founder of Skelly Oil, founded KVOO-TV.

The VHF channel 2 allocation was contested between two groups, both led by prominent Oklahoma oilmen, that competed for approval by the Federal Communications Commission (FCC) to be the holder of the construction permit to build and license to operate a new television station on the third commercial VHF allocation to be assigned to Tulsa. The Southwestern Sales Corporation—owned by William G. Skelly, founder of Skelly Oil and the Mid-Continent Oil and Gas Association, and owner of local radio station KVOO (1170 AM, now KOTV)—filed the initial permit application on June 27, 1952, one week before the FCC released a Report and Order reallocation memorandum that lifted a four-year moratorium on new television broadcast license applications. KVOO had first proposed television broadcasts in 1939, when Skelly and then-general manager W. B. Way purchased $35,000 worth of television equipment for experimental purposes. The other early applicant was All-Oklahoma Broadcasting—a consortium that owned radio station KRMG (740 AM) and included, among other investors, Kerr-McGee co-founders Robert S. Kerr (whose wife, Grayce Kerr, owned the same 25.3% level of interest in All-Oklahoma as that held by her State Senator husband) and Dean A. McGee (who owned 12.6% of the company)—filed a separate license application four weeks later on July 25.

The two groups ultimately decided to merge their respective applications; the consolidated entity, Central Plains Enterprises—which was formed as a 50/50 venture between Southwestern Sales Corporation and All-Oklahoma Broadcasting—filed their new permit application for channel 2 into the FCC on February 20, 1953; to comply with FCC rules that barred common ownership of two or more radio stations operating on the same broadcast band and to allow the Kerrs and McGee to join Skelly in the venture, All-Oklahoma Broadcasting sold KRMG to the Western Broadcasting Company (then-owner of KWHW in Altus) for $305,000. Central Plains concurrently faced new competition for the channel 2 permit, when two new applicants filed for the frequency. The Fryer Television Company—majority owned by Standard-Fryer Drilling Company founder R. J. Fryer—which, as the UHF Television Company, had originally filed to operate a station on UHF channel 23 (allocation now occupied by Fox affiliate KOKI-TV), chose to modify its construction permit/license application to seek the VHF channel 2 allocation. (This effectively resulted in the channel 23 allocation being granted to Albec Oil Company founder/owner J. Elfred Beck, who launched KCEB on that frequency on March 13, 1954.)

The Oil Capital Television Corporation—a group led by several Tulsa businessmen including Fred Jones, owner of local car dealership Fred Jones Ford and half-owner of KFMJ (1050 AM, now KGTO); Tom P. McDermott, director of the Independent Tire Dealers Association; Charles L. McMahon Jr., founder of C. L. McMahon Inc. Oil Producers; insurance executive Dan P. Holmes; and L. Francis Rooney, president of the Manhattan Construction Company—concurrently became the third applicant for the license. On June 16, TulsaVision Inc.—a group co-owned by John E. Mabee, founder of oil drilling contracting firm Mabee Consolidated Corporation, and broadcasting executive John C. Mullins, then-president and general manager of KPHO-TV and KPHO radio (now KFYI) in Phoenix—submitted the fourth application for the frequency. All three competitors dropped out of the bidding over a five-month period beginning in the winter of late 1953. On December 11 of that year, TulsaVision Inc. became the first to withdraw its application, after having earlier applied to have its bid dismissed by the FCC due to ongoing health issues that Mabee was going through at the time. Fryer Television withdrew its application via the grant of an FCC petition on February 12, 1954. The McDermott-Jones group would later follow suit, after Oil Capital Television's principals reached an agreement with the principal owners of Central Plains on June 4. Under said agreement, McDermott, Jones and other shareholders of their company would be given the option of obtaining a 15% interest in Central Plains as compensation for the retraction (these shares were sold back to Central Plains Enterprises in 1963). The FCC granted the permit to Central Plains on July 8, after the agency formally dismissed Oil Capital Television's application.

Three months before it signed on, Skelly chose instead to assign his group's television station the KVOO call letters (which stood for "Voice of Oklahoma") that had been used by the companion radio station since it signed on in June 1926. (The station's initial slogan, "The Eyes of Oklahoma," was an extension of the "Voice of Oklahoma" slogan originated by KVOO radio.) The station began test broadcasts on November 15, 1954, originally transmitting over a closed-circuit television system. KVOO-TV officially commenced regular programming three weeks later on December 5, 1954 with a 39-minute special presentation at 3 p.m. that afternoon, respectively featuring speeches from Skelly, Kerr and McGee and a film from NBC dedicating the station's launch; following that dedication program was the first NBC network program aired by channel 2, Meet the Press. The station—which originally broadcast for 17 hours each day from 7 a.m. to midnight—originally operated from studio facilities located in the Akdar Building on South Denver Avenue (between West Third and West Fourth Streets) in downtown Tulsa. KVOO was also the third television station (behind CBS affiliate KOTV [channel 6], which debuted on October 22, 1949, and KCEB) and the second VHF television station to sign on in the Tulsa market. (ABC affiliate KTVX [channel 8, now KTUL] did not have its city of license reassigned from Muskogee to Tulsa until August 1957, although that station had been operating auxiliary studio facilities located at Lookout Mountain in southwest Tulsa from the time it began operations.)

Channel 2 has carried programming from NBC since its sign-on, having inherited the affiliation through KVOO radio's longtime relationship with the television network's direct radio predecessor, the NBC Red Network, with which it had been affiliated since 1927. It assumed the NBC affiliation from KCEB, which had been serving as the Tulsa market's primary affiliate of the network since its sign-on that March. (KOTV—which had been carrying select NBC programs since that station's sign-on—continued to maintain a secondary NBC affiliation after KCEB debuted, under an agreement that allowed KOTV to continue "cherry-picking" some of the network's stronger programs for broadcast to the entire market, as reception of KCEB's signal was nearly impossible in much of northeastern Oklahoma without an external UHF tuner due to the fact that electronics manufacturers were not required to incorporate UHF tuners into television sets at the time.) In 1955, channel 2 became the first television station in the Tulsa market to begin broadcasting its programming in color, initially transmitting NBC network programming in the format. Broadcasting equipment was installed in the Akdar Building studios that allowed the station to televise local films as well as advertising and promotional slides in color.

During the 1950s and 1960s, KVOO-TV produced several locally produced shows. Among these early local programs was The University of Tulsa Presents, a weekly half-hour program developed and co-produced as a laboratory project by the university's television production department, which premiered in September 1955; the program initially ran weekly until January 1957, and was revived during the first semester of the university's 1963–64 academic year. children's program Big Bill & Oom-A-Gog, a series that aired from 1959 to 1964, which cartoons and live wraparound segments conducted in front of an audience of local children; host William "Big Bill" Blair was often accompanied by a robot named Oom-A-Gog, who lumbered into the studio through a rolling steel door. Another of its most popular shows during this period was Fantastic Theater, a locally produced weekly late-night showcase of classic science fiction and horror films that aired on Friday and Saturday late nights from 1965 to 1968. Host Josef Peter Hardt—who, as the character Mr. Oktoberfest, gave his hosting delivery in an ominous, authentic German accent (Hardt was born in the German river city of Oberhausen)—typically began each show greeting viewers with "Good evening, meine freunde, and welcome to Fantastic Theater," following a brief philosophical monologue tied to the theme of that week's movie.

Ownership of W. G. Skelly's interests in KVOO-TV and KVOO radio would transfer to one of his daughters, Joan Skelly Stuart, and her husband, Harold Stuart, after the elder Skelly died of kidney failure on April 11, 1957. On December 1, 1957, KVOO-TV and KVOO radio moved their respective operations into a purpose-built Streamline Moderne art deco facility on 37th Street and Peoria Avenue in midtown Tulsa's Brookside district. The Brookside Broadcast Center facility, designed by Tulsa-based architectural firm Koberling & Brandborg (a partnership between Joseph Koberling and Lennart Brandborg), was constructed under a floorplan that allowed the television and radio stations to share news department resources. In November 1964, KVOO began originating its locally produced programs in color from its Broadcast Center studios, and features a large spire tower atop the building that houses the station's auxiliary tower (which was originally also used for KVOO radio's transmissions). In November 1964, KVOO-TV purchased a color camera for programming production and began producing its local programs in color.

=== Scripps ownership ===
On June 15, 1970, Central Plains Enterprises sold KVOO-TV to the Scripps-Howard Broadcasting subsidiary of the Cincinnati-based E. W. Scripps Company, for $6.6 million in cash plus $1.2 million worth of stock shares; the sale received FCC approval on November 25, 1970, and was finalized the following month on December 31.

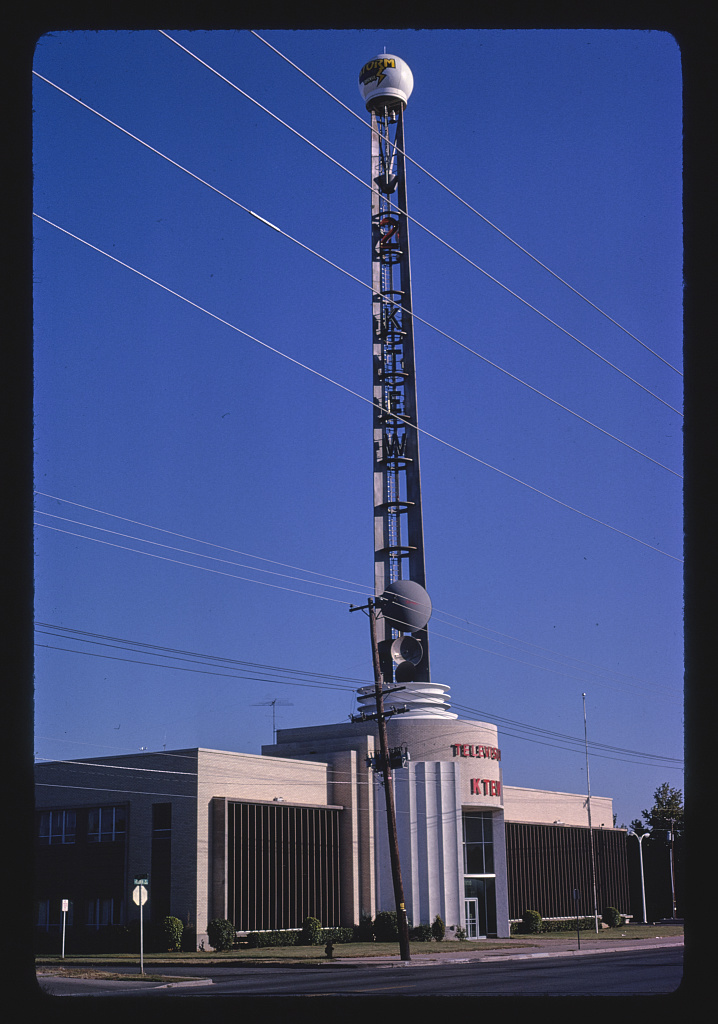
KTEW news studio in 1979.

On January 1, 1971, the day after the Scripps purchase was completed, the station changed its call letters to KTEW-TV (standing for "Tulsa E. W. Scripps", and phonetically similar to their channel number of two). This change was made due to an FCC rule in effect at the time that banned TV and radio stations in the same market, but with different owners from sharing the same call letters. That year, KTEW began operating three low-powered translator stations—K04DY (now a campus independent station operated by Northeastern State University) in Tahlequah, K04DW in Independence, Kansas, and K04EJ in Coffeyville, Kansas—to relay the station's programming in areas of east-central Oklahoma and southeastern Kansas that could not adequately receive the signal; all three translators transmitted on VHF channel 4, but had its transmitters spaced sufficiently far apart to avoid signal interference with fellow NBC affiliate WKY-TV (now KFOR-TV) in Oklahoma City.

On the evening of June 8, 1974, the Brookside district was struck by a destructive F3 tornado that killed one person and caused $44 million in damage. Station management sent most of KTEW's staff to seek shelter as the twister, which reached the district after tearing across the Arkansas River, tracked close to the station's Peoria Avenue studios; the tornado narrowly missed the building and its spire tower to the north, but destroyed a Braum's Ice Cream and Dairy Stores location to the adjacent northwest of the facility. The KTEW studio facility went without electricity most of the night as Public Service Company of Oklahoma (PSO) crews attempted to restore power to the Brookside district. On July 14, 1980, the station's call letters were changed to KJRH, which were assigned in honor of Jack R. Howard, who served as president of the E. W. Scripps Company and chairman of the Scripps-Howard Broadcasting subsidiary from January 1953 until his retirement from the company in December 1976 (the "-TV" suffix was added to the callsign on February 10, 2010; the KTEW call letters are now used by a Retro Television Network–affiliated low-power station based in Ponca City). In July 1985, KJRH became the first television station in the Tulsa market to broadcast in stereo, initially broadcasting NBC network programs, local programs and certain syndicated shows that were transmitted in the audio format.

In April 1992, KJRH became the first Tulsa-area television station to relay its signal directly to a cable television system by fiber optics, after it activated a 5.6-mile-long (9.0 km) fiber cable link between the Peoria Avenue studios and the local headend facility of United Artists Cable (now operated by Cox Communications, which acquired successor Tele-Communications Inc.'s Tulsa cable operations in March 2000) near 44th Street and South Sheridan Avenue—the construction of which was completed weeks prior on March 19. KJRH was not affected by a 1994 affiliation deal between Scripps and its ABC affiliates, as Allbritton Communications (who then owned KTUL) was in the process of signing a group-wide affiliation deal with ABC at the time. In November 1997, KJRH changed its on-air branding to "2 NBC" for general purposes and 2 News NBC for its local newscasts. The station changed its branding to "[Channel] 2 Works for You" in January 2001, following the implementation of a new graphics package that placed the current red and white "square 2" logo (which had first been introduced in May 2001 as a time-temperature bug shown during local newscasts, syndicated programming and intermittently during some NBC network shows) into full-time usage.

In January 2001, per an agreement reached by the group involving Paxson Communications-owned stations in three markets, the E. W. Scripps Company entered into local marketing and joint sales agreements with Pax TV (now Ion) owned-and-operated station KTPX-TV (channel 44). Under the agreement, KJRH handled advertising sales for channel 44, and maintained a news share agreement to allowed that station to air rebroadcasts of channel 2's 10 p.m. newscast after its initial airing; KTPX also occasionally served as a default carrier of NBC programs that could not air on KJRH because of conflicts with special event programming. The LMA ended on July 1, 2005, upon Pax's rebranding as i: Independent Television. On December 31, 2009, the Peoria Avenue studios served as the centerpiece of "The Party! New Year's Eve on Brookside" event in Tulsa's Brookside entertainment district, which also helped benefit the Oklahoma Food Bank. During the close of the festivities, a large, lighted "crystal" ball was dropped from the large spire atop the microwave tower at the building during the countdown to the start of 2010. Streets in the Brookside district near the studio were closed off to allow pedestrian traffic for attendees to the event inspired by the New Year's celebrations at New York City's Times Square.

Station logo used from 2010 to 2021.

On July 30, 2014, Scripps announced it had reached an agreement with Milwaukee, Wisconsin–based Journal Communications to merge their respective broadcasting assets (consisting of KJRH and its 21 fellow existing Scripps television stations, and Journal's thirteen television and 46 radio stations) under its corporate umbrella, and, in turn, spin off its newspaper publishing division into Journal's remaining print unit, which would be rechristened as the Journal Media Group (which was acquired by the Gannett Company in August 2015, three months after the refocused publishing company spun off its own broadcasting and digital assets into Tegna Inc.). The stock-only merger/spin-off transaction—in which Scripps shareholders acquired minority stakes in Journal, while Journal shareholders received minority shares in Scripps—was approved by the FCC on December 12, 2014, and finalized on April 1, 2015. The acquisition of Journal's broadcasting unit displaced KJRH as Scripps's smallest television station by market size (as Journal had owned ten stations in seven markets with a Nielsen ranking lower than Tulsa, the smallest being ABC affiliate and KIVI-TV repeater KSAW-LD in Twin Falls, Idaho), reunited it with KFAQ after 44 years under separate ownership, and placed it under common ownership with Journal's other four Tulsa radio properties, KVOO-FM (98.5), KBEZ (92.9 FM), Muskogee-licensed KHTT (106.9 FM) and Henryetta-licensed KXBL-FM (99.5). On June 25, 2018, Scripps announced it would sell its Tulsa radio properties to Oklahoma City-based Griffin Communications—owner of rival KOTV-DT and CW-affiliated sister KQCW-DT (channel 19)—for $12.5 million. Griffin began operating the radio stations under a local marketing agreement on July 30, and completed the purchase on October 2, 2018, separating KJRH and KFAQ for a second time.

==== Duopoly with KTPX-TV ====
On September 25, 2020, a consortium made up of Scripps and Berkshire Hathaway announced the proposed purchase of Ion Media. The sale was completed on January 7, 2021, making Ion Television station KTPX-TV a sister station to KJRH-TV. The station took advantage of having a sister UHF-band station to address shortfalls in its VHF coverage by adding a simulcast mapped to 2.11 using KTPX's spectrum at the start of March 2021.

== Programming ==
KJRH-TV currently broadcasts the entire NBC network schedule, albeit with variances for certain programs that place them outside of their network-recommended scheduling (as detailed in the section below). However, it may preempt some NBC programs to air long-form breaking news or severe weather coverage, which may be rebroadcast on tape delay over KJRH's main channel in place of regular overnight programs. Station personnel also gives viewers the option of watching the affected shows on NBC's website and mobile app or its cable/satellite video-on-demand service the day after their initial airing.

The station currently airs Today in three blocks—the main program from 7 to 9 am, the third hour from 10 to 11 a.m. and Today with Jenna & Sheinelle from 11 a.m. to noon—with the final two hours airing on tape delay to air Live with Kelly and Mark during the 9 a.m. hour. It also airs the network's educational program block The More You Know on a one-hour delay to accommodate its two-hour-long Saturday morning newscast, and airs Meet the Press on a one-hour delay from the political talk show's live feed (at 9 am).

=== Past program preemptions and deferrals ===
Historically, although NBC was far less tolerant of preemptions than its fellow major network rivals, KVOO/KTEW/KJRH has either preempted or aired out of pattern certain NBC network programs to make room for other local or syndicated programs, including some sporting events and an occasional prime time show. From the 1970s to the mid-1990s, it preempted a selected number of NBC late morning daytime shows to run syndicated and locally produced programs; this was particularly the case during the early and mid-1990s, when KJRH preempted the vast majority of NBC's late-morning talk shows and soap operas, opting to clear only the afternoon soap operas Days of Our Lives (which aired on the station until the series moved to streaming service Peacock in September 2022) and Another World. Among the notable daytime preemptions included Leeza, which was preempted throughout its NBC run from June 1993 (under its original format as John and Leeza from Hollywood) until it was moved to syndication in September 1999; from September 1997 until it was discontinued in December 1999, KJRH preempted Sunset Beach in favor of syndicated programming. Channel 2, the only NBC affiliate to have preempted Sunset Beach, removed the soap from its schedule eight months into its run, after which UPN affiliate KTFO (channel 41, formerly KGCT and now MyNetworkTV affiliate KMYT-TV) carried the program on tape delay in the mid-afternoon.

The station also preempted the final two hours of NBC's Saturday morning cartoon lineup from the late 1970s until 1992. In August 1996, KJRH chose to preempt nearly the entire TNBC lineup (with the exception of Saved by the Bell: The New Class), in favor of a mix of syndicated educational children's shows; channel 2 began clearing most of the TNBC lineup (outside of seasonal companion program NBA Inside Stuff) in September 1999. The station also delayed Late Night (during its David Letterman and Conan O'Brien runs) to 12:05 a.m. from September 1987 until September 2002 to run either syndicated sitcoms, newsmagazines or game shows in the program's recommended 11:35 p.m. timeslot. It also preempted NBC's initial prime time airing of Queer Eye for the Straight Guy in July 2003, citing what station management considered to be poor production values for the show and concerns that promoting a program airing on a competing cable channel—Bravo, which NBC acquired from Rainbow Media the year prior—would cannibalize viewership; the station agreed to clear a second condensed half-hour episode that NBC aired that August.

In a rare instance of a station preempting a syndicated program, KJRH declined carriage of a March 1990 episode of Donahue discussing the topic of music censorship with a syndicated rerun of the defunct NBC medical drama Quincy M.E., which then-general manager Bill Donahue (no relation to Phil) cited was because the episode contained "numerous vulgarities and crude associations" including strong profanity in the song lyrics featured in a music video from one of the episode's guests, rap group 2 Live Crew (portions of which were already electronically censored for broadcast), that were inappropriate to air in the station's regular 4 p.m. timeslot for Donahue. KJRH management opted to rebroadcast the episode following its late newscast on April 1, preempting that night's episode of The Tonight Show.

=== Sports programming ===
In 1986, channel 2 obtained the partial local syndication rights to broadcast regular season and postseason college basketball games involving teams from the Big Eight Conference—which evolved into the Big XII in 1996—that were distributed by Raycom Sports (those rights transferred to ESPN Plus in 1993, with KJRH obtaining that package once the Big Eight changed over-the-air syndication distributors). This agreement allowed the station to carry select regular season games featuring the Oklahoma State Cowboys and the Oklahoma Sooners men's and women's teams, as well as any of their playoff appearances during the first three rounds of the Big 12 men's basketball tournament. Until the conference rights moved locally to WB affiliate KWBT (channel 19, now CW affiliate KQCW-DT) in 2000, most college basketball telecasts on KJRH were shown on Saturday afternoons, although it also occasionally carried prime time games on weeknights, specifically during the Big 12 men's tournament. In addition, in 1998, KJRH-TV entered into a broadcast partnership with the University of Oklahoma's sports broadcasting unit, the Sooner Sports Network, which gave it the local over-the-air broadcast rights to televise college basketball games involving the Sooners men's and women's teams; in addition until 2011, Sooner Sports' agreement with channel 2 included the exclusive local rights to the weekly coaches programs for the Sooners' basketball and football teams.

During the 1990 and 1991 seasons, KJRH held the local syndication rights to broadcast Major League Baseball (MLB) games involving the Kansas City Royals (which were produced by the team's flagship broadcaster at the time, Kansas City-based independent station KSMO-TV [now a MyNetworkTV affiliate], and distributed by the Royals Television Network syndication unit); Royals telecasts returned to independent station KGCT for the 1992 season. Since KJRH lost the local syndication rights to the ESPN-produced Big XII basketball telecasts to KMYT-TV after that station gained the exclusive local rights to the package in 2009 and the rights to the Sooner Sports package in 2014, all sports event broadcasts aired on the station come mainly through NBC Sports.

=== News operation ===
As of September 2018, KJRH-TV presently broadcasts 33 hours of locally produced newscasts each week (with five hours each weekday, 3 1/2 hours on Saturdays and 4 1/2 hours on Sundays). The station is one of ten television in the United States (the majority of which are also owned by Scripps) that carry the "Don't Waste Your Money" consumer reports (filed by John Matarese, the consumer/investigative reporter at ABC-affiliated sister station WCPO in Cincinnati) on a syndicated basis.

The station's Doppler radar system—branded as "2 Works for You Live Radar"—provides live dual-Doppler radar data from sites northwest of Coweta in rural northern Wagoner County and near Gregory in southeastern Rogers County; both also use NEXRAD data from radar sites operated by the National Weather Service (NWS) nationwide. KJRH has the unique characteristic of being only one of two Oklahoma television stations that maintain two Doppler radar sites operated by the station directly (the other being fellow NBC affiliate KFOR-TV in Oklahoma City, whose Doppler radar site near Newcastle is the more powerful of the radar systems operated by the two stations, emitting a radiated power of 1 million watts).

==== News department history ====
Channel 2's news department began operations along with the station on December 5, 1954, originally consisting of half-hour newscasts at 6 and 10 pm, using wire copies of local news headlines read by anchors over still newspaper photographs. The newscasts were anchored by Forrest Brokaw, who had been serving as news director at KVOO radio since 1951 and took on the same role at KVOO-TV, remaining there until he was replaced by George Martin in 1960; Brokaw was joined alongside meteorologist Bill Hyden and sports anchor Len Morton.

In 1970, the station lured Jack Morris—one of the original anchors and the founding news director at KTUL—to anchor KTEW's evening newscasts. In addition to his anchoring duties, Morris became known in the market for his nightly editorial segment, "Commentary," which provided his viewpoint on current events, often reflecting his staunchly conservative views in pertinence on national and world affairs. Channel 2 shot to the top of the local news ratings during this time, right as KTUL was fighting against it for first place, aided by colleagues, chief meteorologist Gary Galvin and sports director Jerry Webber (who joined the station, then KVOO-TV, as a news reporter in 1969). Morris left the station after a seven-year tenure in 1979, and subsequently shifted outside of the news industry to become public relations director for aerospace contractor Nordam Group. In 1976, channel 2 became the first television news operation in the Tulsa market to provide live remote footage for field reports.

In February 1983, Ed Scripps Jr.—the great-grandson of KJRH's parent company namesake, Edward Willis "E. W." Scripps, and whom became an associate producer at the station one year prior after leaving a similar producing role at KCRL (now KRNV-DT) in Reno, Nevada—was appointed as news director. (Scripps Jr., who would later be elected to the E. W. Scripps Company's board of directors in 1998, resigned from the station in August 1993.) During this period, the station's newscasts—while usually in a strong third place behind long-dominant KTUL and perennial second placer KOTV—often competed for and even placed second at times. In September 1986, Webber—who had previously served as anchor of the 6 and 10 p.m. weekday newscasts for ten months from March 1970 until December 1971—was moved back to the anchor desk full-time as co-anchor at 5, 6 and 10 pm, after spending 15 years in the sports department. Replacing him was Al "Big Al" Jerkens, who had previously served as the station's weekend sports anchor from 1979 to 1982 and remained with KJRH until his retirement from full-time broadcasting on August 3, 2017. (Jerkens would stay on as an occasional sports contributor through February 2018, after ceding his sports director role to longtime weekend sports anchor Cayden McFarland.) With his combined 31-year run at KJRH, Jerkens holds the record for the longest single-station tenure for a sports anchor in the Tulsa market.

In May 1990, KJRH dropped the long-standing Newscenter 2 branding and rebranded its newscasts under the Channel 2 News handle. The station positioned itself as "Tulsa's 24 Hour NewsSource" at that time, as it implemented the "24-Hour News Source" concept. The format—which was developed by Cleveland sister station WEWS earlier that year and allowed for stations to provide news headlines to viewers at times when regularly scheduled, long-form newscasts were not being carried—saw KJRH produce 30-second-long news updates near the top of each hour and brief weather updates every half-hour during local commercial break inserts within syndicated and NBC network programs. Shortly afterward, the station launched Channel 2 News Today, a half-hour morning newscast at 6:30 a.m. that became the second such program to launch in the Tulsa market, competing against KTUL's Good Morning Oklahoma. (The program, which was retitled NewsChannel 2 Today following a minor rebrand that took place earlier that year, would expand to a full hour at 6 a.m. on October 4, 1993, and would expand earlier over time, first to 1 1/2 hours in September 1995, then to two hours in May 2001 and finally to 2 1/2 hours on June 7, 2016.)

In October 1990, Tulsa County prosecutors presiding over the DUI/vehicular manslaughter trial of Billy Ray Hinshaw (who killed two Macomb men in a head-on collision in east Tulsa that July) attempted to subpoena KJRH news photographer Mark Whaley to testify about what he saw at the accident scene while filming the story; the Oklahoma Court of Criminal Appeals intervened following an emergency order by Whaley and Scripps Jr. to stay the trial, citing state journalist shield statutes and the need to protect the station's journalistic independence. Chief Prosecutor Tom Gillert contended that issue pertained to whether journalists had "blanket immunity" from being forced to testify when no question of confidentiality, or confidential sources, was at issue. The Court of Criminal Appeals ruled in January 1992, that prosecutors could not force Whaley to testify unless prosecutors proved that any evidence cannot be obtained by other means. On October 3, 1993, the station debuted Insight, a weekly public affairs program (originally hosted by weekday morning anchor Darlene Hill) with discussions focusing on prominent people and issues in the Tulsa area's ethnic community. On April 26, 1991, a KJRH storm chasing unit led by meteorologist Gary Shore observed the touchdown of what became a violent 3/4-mile wide (1.2 km), F4 tornado near Red Rock. Shore and his photographer recorded the tornado—which traveled for 66 miles (106 km) and injured six people—from a position about 1 mile (1.6 km) south of the funnel, though the inflow winds into the parent supercell were strong enough to nearly blow his cap off his face before catching them as he stood in front of the tornado.

Abrupt changes to KJRH's newscasts took place in the fall of 1994. Margaret "Peggy" Phillip, who had served as managing editor at WSVN in Miami, was appointed as news director in January 1994 and brought a considerably watered-down version of WSVN's fast-paced news format to Tulsa. Prior to Phillips' appointment and the subsequent implementation of the retooled 2 News identity that September, Philip and then-general manager Bill Donahue began changing the newscast anchor lineups; in March 1994, 6 p.m. anchor Karen Keith was moved from to the 5 p.m. newscast in a move to "help build the 5 p.m. news" by teaming her with Webber. Denise Brewer was promoted to female co-anchor at 6 pm, co-anchoring with Jay Rickerts, while remaining partnered with Webber on the 10 p.m. late news. (Brewer and Rickerts would later be paired on the 5 p.m. newscast in January 1995.) The set was also revamped and included a large video monitor, which was prominently featured during sports segments (with game clips and full-screen graphics being shown behind either Al Jerkens or weekend sports anchor Keith Isbell, who sat in a director's chair), in a concept borrowed by and developed with the help of news management at WTSP in Tampa, Florida.

Much of the news department staff's doubts about the new, impending tabloid style were realized once the format was implemented in September 1994. Some of the station's prominent newscasters disliked the WSVN-style format—which, in the original form developed by longtime WSVN news director Joel Cheatwood, became well known for its emphasis on crime stories and sensationalistic reporting, earning the Miami station a reputation as a pioneer in tabloid television—and resigned. Webber quickly became displeased with the new tabloid-style format, and, after negotiations between him and Phillip (which included attempts to offer Webber a role as managing editor) failed, announced his resignation as evening anchor on January 5, 1995. Webber reversed course one week later, deciding to continue as 6 p.m. co-anchor and taking on a role as managing editor, while Keith was promoted to community specialist in addition to co-anchoring that same broadcast. Shore was one of the first to actually leave KJRH in response to Phillip's changes. Only one month prior to the revamp, Shore decided to resign over his displeasure of the reduction in airtime allotted to weather segments within the newscasts from three minutes to 1 3/4 minutes (this move, which was made up for by having weather segments air every six minutes during its newscasts, was fairly unusual as Oklahoma television stations traditionally place an emphasis on weather, in part because of the state's location within the climatological peak region of Tornado Alley). He signed off from KJRH after spending 16 years at the station (minus a brief stint at WJLA-TV in Washington, D.C. from 1982 to 1983) on December 1, 1994; Jeff Lazalier—who had previously served as a weekend meteorologist at channel 2 from 1984 to 1989, before moving to KFOR-TV in Oklahoma City—was hired to replace Shore as chief meteorologist in December 1995. (Lazalier would, ironically, be replaced by his former KFOR colleague Dan Threlkeld following the former's firing by KJRH in October 2002.) KJRH's morning newscast went through periodic turnover during this time as well; John Hudson (whose first tenure at channel 2, from 1976 to 1978, saw him serve as Jack Morris's co-anchor on the evening newscasts) collapsed and died in June 1994 from a massive heart attack he suffered 40 minutes before going on-air to anchor an edition of Channel 2 News Today. His co-anchor, Gillian Kirk (who began co-anchoring the program with Hudson in 1994), was subsequently paired with John McIntire; both Kirk and McIntire were replaced by Karen Larsen (the original Saturday anchor of KTUL's Good Morning Oklahoma) and Mike Browning in June 1996.

In November 1995, KWHB entered into a news share agreement with KJRH-TV to produce twice-daily news and weather updates each weekday at 5:55 and 6:29 pm. The five-minute-long updates used the same anchors as those seen on KJRH's 5 and 6 p.m. newscasts. These news updates continued to air until the agreement concluded in 1998. In November 1997, KJRH began providing closed captioning of its severe weather coverage for deaf and hard of hearing viewers under an agreement with Ability Resources, a locally based agency that provides resources for disabled persons. Shortly after the launch of the 2 News NBC identity in October 1997, KJRH also began to emphasize other local programs alongside its newscasts, moving Webber and Keith from their anchoring roles as a result. Webber began hosting "From the Heartland," a series of five-minute-long, thrice-daily feature segments highlighting life in Oklahoma (which he continued to do until shortly before his death from stomach cancer in December 1998) that was similar in format to his bi-monthly half-hour series Oklahoma People; Keith, meanwhile, began hosting Oklahoma Living, a half-hour midday lifestyle talk show that premiered in January 1998 (for a time, the program also aired nationally on then-corporate cousin HGTV and statewide on the Oklahoma Educational Television Authority [OETA]). Evening co-anchor Denise Brewer was dismissed around his time, which she cited in a Tulsa World interview occurred after being told by management her contract would not be renewed because she was "too '90s" and "not deferential enough to men on the set". In February 1999, the station premiered The Weekend Show, a Saturday evening local entertainment news program hosted by Jonathan Dylen that lasted only seven months due to low ratings and frequent NBC Sports event run-ins, while longtime documentary producer Jack Frank—who produced the Tulsa History Series documentaries for OETA and later for KOTV from 1989 to 1997—began hosting the Oklahoma Memories series of thrice-weekly short films about the state's history told through modern images and historical film clips.

Several changes to the newscasts took place in the summer of 2001. When the former Channel 2 News moniker was restored as KJRH's newscast branding that May, the morning newscast adopted a more hard news format and began featuring weather and traffic segments in ten-minute intervals at times ending in "2", with cooking and interview segments being relegated to either the new midday newscast or within Keith's community segments; sports coverage was also dropped from the weekday 5 p.m. newscast, in favor of additional news and health segments. On July 16, the station premiered a half-hour midday newscast at 11 am; originally anchored by the husband-and-wife team of Russ McCaskey and Deborah Lauren McCaskey (who replaced Keith Isbell and Deirdre Davis as anchors of Channel 2 News Today at that time), the program was the first midday newscast to air on the station since it canceled a prior half-hour broadcast at noon in 1996. (The midday newscast would expand to a full hour on September 8, 2015; it would move to noon in August 2018.) Oklahoma Living was also relegated to Sunday mornings effective on July 22, where it remained until its cancellation that December. Larsen and John Walls were also appointed as anchors of the 5 p.m. newscast in place of McCaskey and Stephanie Dukes, the latter of whom was moved to a role as health reporter.

In May 2003, the station launched hour-long weekend morning newscasts at 8 a.m. on Saturdays and Sundays. (The broadcast would expand to two hours on September 30, while an hour-long extension of the Sunday edition at 10 a.m. was added in September 2013, in a revamp that saw the existing Sunday broadcast be separated into two additional blocks at 6 and 8 am) On February 25, 2008, KJRH became the first television station in the state of Oklahoma to begin broadcasting its local newscasts in high definition.

In recent years, KJRH's newscasts have placed at a distant third among the local television newscasts in the Tulsa market. However, in July 2009, KJRH's newscasts set a new benchmark for the station, firmly capturing second place in nearly all timeslots; KJRH's ratings in the 5–6 a.m. slot on weekday mornings increased to a 2 rating and a 10 share, while remaining second in early evening news (behind KOTV) with a 7 rating/12 share during the November 2009 ratings period. On July 30, 2018, KJRH expanded its 6 p.m. newscast on weeknights to an hour, only for the broadcast to revert to a half-hour two months later on September 24; it had marked the first time any television station in the Tulsa market aired its 6 p.m. newscast for a full hour.

==== Notable former on-air staff ====
- Jim Forbes – investigative reporter (1980–1981)
- Ron Franklin – sports director (1967–1971)
- Anthony Mason – reporter (1980–1982)
- Nicole Mitchell – meteorologist (2002–2004)
- Mike Morgan – meteorologist (1985–1988)
- Steven Romo – anchor (2013–2016)
- Ron Stone – anchor

== Technical information ==
=== Subchannels ===
The station's signal is multiplexed:

Subchannels of KJRH-TV
Subchannel	Res.	Short name	Programming
2.1	1080i	KJRH-HD	NBC
2.2	480i	Bounce	Bounce TV
2.3	480i	LAFF	Laff
2.4	480i	ION+	Ion Plus
2.5	480i	Grit	Grit
2.6	480i	BUSTED	Busted
2.7	480i	QVC2	QVC2

=== Analog-to-digital conversion ===
KJRH-TV launched a digital signal on UHF channel 56 on January 24, 2002, become the first television station in the Tulsa market to transmit a digital broadcast feed. That day, it became the first television station in the Tulsa market to broadcast local content in high definition, when it televised station promotions filmed in the format that aired during NBC's coverage of the 2002 Winter Olympics.

The station ended regular programming on its analog signal, over VHF channel 2, on June 12, 2009, the original date on which full-power television stations in the United States were to transition from analog to digital broadcasts under federal mandate. The station's digital signal operated on a high-band UHF channel (in the 52 to 69 channel range) that was removed from broadcast use after the official June 12, 2009, transition date; its analog channel assignment was in the low-band VHF range (channels 2 to 6) and therefore prone to signal interference from impulse noise; as a result, KJRH selected VHF channel 8 (the former channel allocation used by KTUL's analog signal) for its post-transition digital operations. Digital television receivers display the station's virtual channel as its former VHF analog channel 2. As part of the SAFER Act, KJRH kept its analog signal on the air until June 26 to inform viewers of the digital television transition through a loop of public service announcements from the National Association of Broadcasters.
