= KOTV-DT =

Television station in Tulsa, Oklahoma

- Tulsa, Oklahoma; United States
- Channels: Digital: 26 (UHF); Virtual: 6
- Branding: KOTV 6; News on 6

Programming
- Affiliations: 6.1: CBS; for others, see § Subchannels

Ownership
- Owner: Griffin Media; (Griffin Licensing, LLC)
- Sister stations: TV: KQCW-DT; Radio: KRQV; KOTV; KHTT; KVOO-FM; KXBL

History
- First air date: October 22, 1949
- Former call signs: KOTV (1949–2009)
- Former channel numbers: Analog: 6 (VHF, 1949–2009); Digital: 55 (UHF, until 2009), 45 (UHF, 2009–2020)
- Former affiliations: All secondary: Paramount (1949–1953); ABC (1949–1954); NBC (1949–1954); DuMont (1949–1954)
- Call sign meaning: Oklahoma Television

Technical information
- Licensing authority: FCC
- Facility ID: 35434
- ERP: 574 kW
- HAAT: 556.28 m (1,825 ft)
- Transmitter coordinates: 36°1′15″N 95°40′33″W
- Translator(s): see § Translators

Links
- Public license information: Public file; LMS
- Website: www.newson6.com

KOTV-DT (channel 6) is a television station in Tulsa, Oklahoma, United States, affiliated with CBS. It is owned by Griffin Media alongside Muskogee-licensed CW affiliate KQCW-DT (channel 19). The two stations share studios at the Griffin Media Center on North Boston Avenue and East Cameron Street in the downtown neighborhood's Tulsa Arts District; KOTV's transmitter is located on South 273rd East Avenue (just north of the Muskogee Turnpike) in Broken Arrow, Oklahoma.

== History ==
=== Early history ===
On March 24, 1948, the Cameron Television Corporation submitted an application to the Federal Communications Commission (FCC) for a construction permit to build and license to operate a broadcast television station in Tulsa that would transmit on VHF channel 6. The company was owned by George E. Cameron Jr., a Texas-born independent oil producer, broadcasting executive Maria Helen Alvarez and John B. Hill, a salesman for a Tulsa oil field supplier. Both Hill, who would serve as KOTV's original sales manager, and Alvarez owned 15 percent stakes in the company.

An employee at KTUL radio, Alvarez conducted a two-year study for station owner John Toole "J. T." Griffin and sister Marjory Griffin Leake into the viability of local television in Tulsa. Alvarez, who had been interested in television since seeing the Dumont studios on a Washington, D.C., business trip, recommended to file for a license application as soon as possible, but Griffin and Leake considered television to still be too risky. In turn, Alvarez resigned from KTUL and sought investors willing to get a station built right away. Through a mutual acquaintance, Alvarez was introduced to Cameron, who was earning $50,000 on a monthly basis and was himself interested in television station ownership. The Cameron-Alvarez-Hill application was unopposed with no other competing applications, allowing the FCC to grant their request on June 2, 1948. A heretofore unnoticed typo in the application assigned the calls KOVB instead of the intended KOTV, for "Oklahoma Television"; this was corrected by the commission in March 1949.

KOTV secured studio space at a former International Harvester dealership in downtown Tulsa in what was, at the time, the largest facility for an American television station. A second floor was added to the 7,800 sq ft (720 m^{2}) facility in the fall of 1954. A 1,328-foot (405 m) transmitter tower was built in the backyard of chief engineer George Jacobs and hoisted to the top of the National Bank of Tulsa Building; Alvarez spent a year convincing National Bank officers that the tower would be safe and, in time, become a local landmark. While the tower was being installed, a workman's wrench fell from atop the building, fatally striking the head of a woman walking underneath the construction site. Detractors took to calling the accident "Cameron's Folly" and used the story to label KOTV as "jinxed"; at a Tulsa Chamber of Commerce luncheon, one radio executive said that anyone investing in KOTV or buying a television set was "foolish".

Cameron Television continued on, with Alvarez (who served as president of Cameron Television and general manager of KOTV) handling all aspects of the station's development, while Cameron himself primarily focused on supervising his many oil properties in California. Alvarez and her company co-partners invested nearly $500,000 into developing the station; in an interview with the St. Louis Post-Dispatch shortly before the station signed on, she made the bold statement that KOTV would be operating in the "black" within six months of its sign-on, a comment dismissed by many of its detractors. Alvarez also visited 42 of the 89 existing television stations already in operation throughout the United States to study the intricacies of running a television station.

KOTV first began test transmissions on October 15, 1949; the pattern signal was seen by a handful of viewers among the 3,500 northeastern Oklahoma residents that owned television receivers, carrying as far away as Enid and Eufaula, Oklahoma, Monett, Missouri and Fayetteville, Arkansas. The station started regular broadcasts on October 22, 1949. It was the first television station to sign on in the Tulsa market, the second to sign on in the state of Oklahoma (after WKY-TV [now KFOR-TV] in Oklahoma City, which debuted five months earlier on June 6) and the 90th to sign on in the United States. More than one month later, on November 23, KOTV broadcast its first locally produced program: a live meeting by the Tulsa Chamber of Commerce at the Tulsa Club (on East 5th Street and South Cincinnati Avenue), which was attended by many of the station's original critics. One week later, on November 30, the station commenced regular broadcasts at 7 p.m. with a "Special Dedication Program" that featured guests such as Oklahoma governor Roy J. Turner; Tulsa mayor Roy Lundy; singer Patti Page; Leon McAuliffe and his western swing band; and Miss Oklahoma Louise O'Brien. The next day on December 1, KOTV broadcast a two-hour sampling of the top programs from all five networks of the time from which the station carried programming during its first few years. Over 3,000 television sets were placed throughout the city for public viewing, some of them set on sidewalks outside of appliance stores. After several days of this sampling, the public began to buy their own television sets and KOTV began to cement a small, but growing, viewing audience in the Four State Area.

Originally broadcasting for 11½ hours per day from 12:30 p.m. to midnight seven days a week, the station has been a primary CBS television affiliate since it signed on. Channel 6 initially also maintained secondary affiliations with NBC, the DuMont Television Network and the Paramount Television Network at its launch; KOTV would add a fifth affiliation on November 15, when it began carrying a limited selection of ABC network programs. Along with network shows, in its early years, one-third of the station's schedule was devoted to locally produced programs. Even though KOTV's relations with all of the commercial broadcast networks were smooth, the station showed a preference for CBS's program offerings over the others. At first, network programming was aired about one week after their initial live broadcast on the East Coast; it would not be until 1952, before the installation of a microwave link with New York City made reception of live network programming possible. Three hours of programming were filled by varied network content during the evening hours.

On May 12, 1952, Cameron and Hill sold a controlling 85% interest in KOTV to another Texas oil magnate, Jack D. Wrather Jr., and his mother, Maizie Wrather, for $2.5 million (a purchase price far exceeding the amount it cost to build the station). Wrather knew little about television, and persuaded Alvarez – who retained 15% of the station's shares – to stay on as general manager (a role she had held since KOTV signed on, and a groundbreaking one in broadcasting, as she became the first female to work as a general manager of a television station). Wrather also made her a full partner in a new joint venture entity that became known as Wrather-Alvarez Inc. (later renamed the General Television Corporation in January 1954). The sale received FCC approval on July 31. By 1954, the station expanded its daily schedule to 17 hours per day from 7 a.m. to midnight.

Because of the aforementioned freeze on license application grants, KOTV was the only television station in the Tulsa market until 1954. That March, KOTV gained its first competitor when UHF station KCEB (channel 23, channel now occupied by Fox affiliate KOKI-TV) signed on as a primary NBC and secondary DuMont affiliate. However, as manufacturers were not required to include UHF tuners on television sets at the time, NBC struck a backdoor agreement with KOTV that allowed channel 6 to continue "cherry-picking" stronger shows from that network. In April 1954, KOTV installed color transmission equipment, in a byproduct of an agreement with NBC to carry network programs produced in the format; the station would air its first network color broadcast, the children's program Ding Dong School, one month later on May 21. A few months later on December 5, KVOO-TV (channel 2, now KJRH-TV) signed on and took the remaining NBC programs that KOTV carried. In preparation of losing NBC programming, KCEB had switched to a primary ABC affiliation in July of that year, with that network agreeing to affiliate with channel 23 on the condition that KOTV be allowed to cherry-pick its shows as well. KTVX took all of the remaining ABC programs when that station debuted on September 18, 1954, which left KOTV with an exclusive CBS affiliation and KCEB (which, like many early UHF television stations, would cease operations in December of that year as a result of losing its affiliations with NBC and ABC) saddled with fourth-ranked DuMont. Also in 1954, KOTV constructed a 1,135-foot (346 m) transmitter tower at the Osage–Tulsa county line (north of Sand Springs) near Big Heart Mountain, a hill which was named by station president C. Wade Petersmeyer. KOTV management subsequently reached an agreement with the Oklahoma Educational Television Authority (OETA) to lease space on the tower – which became the fifth tallest structure in the world at the time of its completion that October – for the transmitter of proposed educational station KOED (channel 11), which would eventually sign on January 12, 1959. The new transmission facility also came with an increase in its transmitter power from 16.5 kW to 100 kW, expanding KOTV's signal coverage to a 24,000-square-mile (62,000 km^{2}) area. In 1956, KOTV began carrying select programs from the NTA Film Network.

=== Corinthian Broadcasting and Belo ownership ===
KOTV logo used from February 1996 to October 24, 2010

In April 1954, General Television sold KOTV to Indianapolis-based venture capital firm J. H. Whitney & Company for $4 million. The transaction involved a two-phase transfer in which KOTV was reassigned from General Television directly to Alvarez, Wrather and the latter's mother, Maizie Wrather, all of whom would then transfer their interests to Whitney-owned licensee Osage Broadcasting Corp. The transfer received FCC approval on May 14, with KOTV becoming Whitney's first broadcasting property. Whitney (whose namesake owner, philanthropist and investor John Hay "Jock" Whitney, was the brother-in-law of CBS chairman William S. Paley) folded the group – which had expanded to include fellow CBS affiliates KGUL-TV (now Houston-based KHOU) in Galveston, Texas, WISH-TV (now a CW affiliate) and WISH (AM) (now WTLC) in Indianapolis, and WANE-TV and WANE radio (now WIOE) in Fort Wayne, Indiana – into a new subsidiary, the Corinthian Broadcasting Corporation, on April 26, 1957.

In 1958, KOTV became the first television station in Oklahoma to install videotape equipment for the production and broadcast of programming. The following year, in 1959, KOTV upgraded its equipment to broadcast local film shows in color; the later began broadcasting its local programming in color in December 1966. On December 3, 1969, Corinthian Broadcasting – which had its ownership transferred directly to J. H. Whitney from his company's Whitney Communications Corporation unit two years earlier – announced it had reached an agreement to be acquired by private equity firm Dun & Bradstreet for $137 million in stock. Following a 16-month-long regulatory review process that included a deadlocked 3–3 tie vote when the agency first considered the sale's approval in November 1970, the purchase received FCC approval on April 14, 1971, and was finalized the following month on May 27. In 1974, KOTV maintained an affiliation with the TVS Television Network, carrying the network's World Football League game telecasts in place of CBS's Thursday night lineup.

On June 19, 1983, the Dallas, Texas-based A. H. Belo Corporation acquired the six Corinthian Television properties (with WISH-TV and WANE-TV subsequently being spun off to LIN Broadcasting) from Dun and Bradstreet for $606 million; KOTV's purchase price was $41 million. The sale – which was considered to be the largest group purchase by a single broadcasting company up to that time, surpassing the price of the Gannett Company's $370-million purchase of Combined Communications Corporation in 1979 – received FCC approval on November 22, 1983, and was finalized in late January 1984. In 1984, KOTV and KJRH formed a consortium to have a new 1,825 feet (556 m)-tall tower constructed between Broken Arrow and Oneta, which was completed in 1985. Additional transmitters were subsequently installed to serve as auxiliary facilities for KOED and religious independent station KWHB (channel 47).

=== Griffin Media ownership ===
On October 18, 2000, Belo announced that it would sell KOTV to Oklahoma City-based Griffin Communications (now Griffin Media and run by the descendants of John T. Griffin) for $82 million. Under Griffin ownership, the company intended to pool resources and content between the news operations of KOTV and Oklahoma City flagship station KWTV; the purchase also made KOTV a sister station to NBC affiliate KPOM-TV (now Fox affiliate KFTA-TV) and satellite station KFAA (now KNWA-TV) in the adjacent Fort Smith–Fayetteville, Arkansas market (Griffin Communications would sell the latter two stations to the Nexstar Broadcasting Group in 2004, in order to focus on its broadcast properties in Oklahoma City and Tulsa). The purchase was finalized on January 3, 2001, returning the station to Oklahoma-based ownership after 38 years. On May 1, 2001, Griffin launched a Tulsa area feed of its cable news joint venture with Cox Communications, News Now 53, offering live and repeat newscasts from KOTV (maintaining the same rolling news format that had been in place when the channel launched on Cox's Oklahoma City system with news content from KWTV in December 1996). Griffin Communications acquired Cox's interest in News Now 53 on April 1, 2011, converting it into a broadcast-originated service via subchannels of KOTV and KWTV under the respective brands News on 6 Now and News 9 Now. Griffin invested $10 million to purchase production control and master control equipment to accommodate high-definition and digital broadcasts as well as upgrades to its digital transmitter.

On October 8, 2005, Griffin Communications purchased Muskogee-licensed WB affiliate KWBT (channel 19, now CW affiliate KQCW-DT) from Spokane, Washington-based Cascade Broadcasting Group for $33.5 million ($26.8 million for the non-license assets and $6.7 million for the license itself). Under the terms of the deal, Griffin assumed responsibility for KWBT's advertising sales and administrative operations under a local marketing agreement (LMA) that continued until the sale's closure. When the deal was finalized on September 29, 2005, KOTV and KWBT became the fourth commercial television station duopoly in the Tulsa market, after Fox affiliate KOKI-TV and then-UPN affiliate KTFO (channel 41, now MyNetworkTV affiliate KMYT-TV), which had been jointly operated through an LMA since 1993 and became commonly owned when Clear Channel Communications purchased channel 41 outright in 2001. KWBT subsequently migrated its operations from its studio facility in Yukon, into KOTV's Frankfort Avenue studios on December 6 of that year.

On October 25, 2007, Griffin announced that it would construct a 50,000-square-foot (4,645 m^{2}) media center on North Boston Avenue and East Cameron Street in downtown Tulsa's Brady Arts District (renamed the Tulsa Arts District in September 2017) that would house KOTV, KQCW and Griffin New Media, which manages the websites operated by Griffin Communications. The station – which, amid an increase in staffing from 130 employees prior to Belo's sale of the station to around 180 since Griffin took ownership, had been renting a portable building on a lot near the Frankfort Avenue studio to house its advertising sales department, and annexed space in the Pierce Building on Third Street and Detroit Avenue to house KQCW's staff – intended to consolidate the employees of its various departments into a single facility. Groundbreaking on the site took place on April 8, 2008, with an original targeted completion date for sometime in the summer of 2009. However, construction on the $11.8-million facility was delayed in the midst of the global recession; construction formally commenced in October 2011, and was completed in early November 2012. The facility incorporates a 5,400-square-foot (502 m^{2}) production studio (which is sound-proofed with multiple layers of sheet rock and insulation in the walls and ceiling, and incorporates upgraded equipment that allowed for KOTV to begin producing its news programming to full high definition); an adjoining 7,000-square-foot (650 m^{2}) newsroom; two control rooms that relay high definition content; and LED lighting equipment throughout the building and an underground system of 32 geothermal heating and cooling wells beneath its parking lot to reduce electricity costs. KOTV/KQCW's news, sales and marketing departments moved to the new Griffin Communications Media Center – which was dedicated in the names of company founders John T. and Martha Griffin – on January 19, 2013 (commencing broadcasts with that evening's edition of the 5 p.m. newscast), ending KOTV's 63-year tenure at the South Frankfort Avenue facility; all remaining operations were moved into the new facility by January 20. Some archival material in the former building (including news footage, specials and still photographs dating to the 1950s) was donated to the Oklahoma Historical Society.

On June 25, 2018, the E. W. Scripps Company announced it would sell its Tulsa-area radio properties – KFAQ (1170 AM), KVOO-FM (98.5), KBEZ (92.9 FM), Muskogee-licensed KHTT (106.9 FM) and Henryetta-licensed KXBL-FM (99.5) – to Griffin Communications for $12.5 million. The purchase marks Griffin's entry into radio station ownership, even though the company has owned the Radio Oklahoma Network syndicated news service since 2005; it also puts KOTV in the unusual position of being co-owned with KFAQ, a station which – through its then-ownership by the Southwestern Sales Corporation – founded rival KJRH (as KVOO-TV) in December 1954. Griffin began operating the radio stations under an LMA on July 30, and completed the purchase on October 2, 2018.

== Programming ==
Channel 6 served as the Tulsa market's "Love Network" affiliate for the Muscular Dystrophy Association's Jerry Lewis MDA Labor Day Telethon for 38 years from September 1973 until September 1999. Because of the station's commitments to run CBS' entertainment and sports programming, KOTV usually aired the telethon on a three-hour tape delay following its 10 p.m. newscast on the Sunday preceding Labor Day, although some CBS sports telecasts—such as coverage of the US Open tennis tournament, which aired on other local stations and local origination cable channels, and from 2011 to 2013, News on 6 Now—was preempted in favor of the telethon. (The rights to the broadcast were assumed by Fox affiliate KOKI-TV in September 2000; the broadcast—by then reduced to a two-hour special—moved to ABC in September 2013, airing thereafter by association on KTUL until the final telecast of the retitled MDA Show of Strength in August 2014.)

=== Local programming ===
One of KOTV's first locally produced programs was Lookin' At Cookin', a daily cooking show that was originally hosted by Anne Mahoney. The program was one of several locally produced cooking shows that were produced and sponsored by Oklahoma Natural Gas, and was the longest-running such program produced by the utility company; Lookin' At Cookin' was broadcast from the nation's first "Telecast Kitchen", which operated at the South Frankfort Avenue studios throughout the show's 32-year run until its cancellation in 1981. Eventually, the show was cut down to a five-minute mid-morning program and was retitled Coffee Break, which preempted the Douglas Edwards-anchored CBS Midday Newsbreak. One of the station's most successful local shows was Lewis Meyer's Bookshelf. Hosted by author and literary critic Lewis Meyer beginning in 1953, the program featured reviews and excerpts read by Meyer of new and classic books showcased from his eponymous bookstore (which operated at 35th Street and South Peoria Avenue in the city's Brookside district for many years, and was featured in a Paula Zahn profile on Meyer and his program in a March 1993 CBS This Morning segment). Meyer would close each program by reminding viewers that "the more books you read, the taller you grow". The program ran on Sunday mornings for its entire 42-year run, the longest tenure of any non-news local program in Tulsa television history, until January 1995, when it ended its run with a tribute to Meyer (who died from heart failure earlier that month).

The children's variety program King Lionel's Court, which aired from 1958 to 1973, featured host Lee Woodward and his lion puppet sidekick named King Lionel (Woodward created and puppeteered King Lionel, whom Woodward would bring on to make regular appearances during the station's 5 p.m. newscasts for most of the 1970s). Woodward spent most of 1957-82 tenure at channel 6 as the station's lead meteorologist, and also served as host of the 1966–74 series Dance Party, an American Bandstand–style Saturday afternoons dance show that courted such famed musicians as The Temptations, Paul Revere and the Raiders, and The Beach Boys. Other noted local programs that have aired on channel 6 include The Uncanny Film Festival and Camp Meeting, a Saturday late-night film showcase and sketch comedy program hosted by Gailard Sartain as Dr. Mazeppa Pompazoidii and local comedian/radio DJ Jim Millaway (using the stage name Sherman Oaks) from 1970 to 1973, and which also featured a then-unknown Gary Busey among its sketch players; Zeta, on Satellite Six, a space-themed children's program showcasing Little Rascals shorts that was hosted by Jim Ruddle (who would later transition into a career in television news that began at KOTV) from 1953 to 1959; and The Woman's Page, a daily talk show hosted by Betty Boyd that ran from 1955 to 1965.

=== Program preemptions and deferrals ===
Since its 1949 sign-on, KOTV has periodically preempted or given tape-delayed clearances to some CBS programs to air local, syndicated or special event programs. Between September 1985 and August 1993, KOTV was one of several CBS stations to preempt the network's late night lineup, opting to air syndicated sitcom and drama reruns in place of The CBS Late Movie / CBS Late Night and Crimetime After Primetime blocks and the short-lived Pat Sajak Show. (Independent station KGCT-TV carried the CBS late night block from September 1987 until it temporarily ceased operations in February 1990.)

In 1987, KOTV was one of a number of CBS stations that refused to air a television adaptation of the then-popular Garbage Pail Kids trading card series on Saturday mornings, owing to concerns regarding the show's ridicule of the disabled and its abundance of heavy violence. This prompted CBS to remove the series from their Saturday morning schedule for the 1987–88 television season, and the series, to date, has never been telecast in the United States.

Upon its August 1993 premiere, KOTV was among a handful of CBS affiliates that received network permission to air the Late Show with David Letterman on a half-hour delay, in order to air syndicated reruns of Designing Women after its 10 p.m. newscast; it would give in to airing Letterman in its recommended timeslot in January 1994. The station also delayed The Late Late Show—during the entire Tom Snyder, Craig Kilborn and Craig Ferguson runs, and the first two years of James Corden's tenure—until 12:07 a.m. from the program's January 1995 debut until December 2016, in favor of syndicated sitcom reruns and, later, same-day encores of Inside Edition.

As a result of the expansion of its local morning newscast into a two-hour broadcast in September 1993, KOTV has aired CBS' morning news-talk programs—CBS This Morning (both the 1987–1999 and 2012–2021 versions) and The Early Show (from 1999 to 2012)—on a tape delay to accommodate Six in the Morning; in September 1996, channel 6 began preempting most of the first hour of (the original) CBS This Morning in favor of an additional hour of its morning newscast (titled Six This Morning), after exercising a network option that allowed affiliates to produce a mix of in-house local segments and a selection of national segments from the first hour of the This Morning broadcast; in January 2008, KOTV began airing the Early Show in its entirety on a one-hour delay from 8 to 10 a.m., which carried over into the 2012 version of This Morning. (The station similarly aired predecessor show Morning a half-hour earlier than its recommended slot by way of a live feed tape delay from 1978 to 1982, in favor of airing the half-hour local talk show Tulsa Morning.) On September 13, 2021, KOTV began airing the rebranded CBS Mornings from 7 to 9 a.m., in line with other CBS affiliates in the Central Time Zone.

In December 1993, the station began to preempt The Bold and the Beautiful (B&B) to make room for an expanded one-hour edition of its noon newscast. Thereafter, B&B could only be viewed within the market via fringe reception or rural cable availability of either KWTV, KOAM-TV in Joplin or KFSM-TV in Fort Smith. CBS eventually gave KOTV permission to air B&B after the network's late night schedule (at 1:05 a.m.) in September 2004. (Sister station KQCW aired the program in its network-recommended slot from September 2006 until January 2007, while continuing to air on KOTV in late night.)

After Face the Nation expanded to a one-hour broadcast in April 2014, as certain other CBS affiliates have done since that time, KOTV aired the first half-hour of the Sunday morning talk show live-to-air on Sunday mornings and the second half-hour early Monday mornings on tape delay until February 2016 (during this time, the program aired in its entirety on KOTV-DT2 off its "live" feed in the form of a partial simulcast with the station's main feed during FTN's first half-hour). To accommodate the network's Saturday morning newscast, channel 6 also aired CBS' Saturday morning children's program block in two separate sub-blocks from January 1995 until September 2010, with much of the block airing in pattern on its normal airdate from 7 to 9 a.m. and an additional hour airing on Sundays from 7 to 8 a.m. for most of that period (As of September 2017, the station elects to air the final two hours of the CBS Dream Team educational programming block on Sundays from 7 to 9 a.m., to make room for CBS This Morning Saturday and a two-hour-long Saturday edition of Six in the Morning.)

KOTV was one of five Belo-owned CBS affiliates that preempted a November 22, 1998, 60 Minutes segment on controversial pathologist Jack Kevorkian, which included a video of a voluntary human euthanasia that Kevorkian administered to ALS patient Thomas Youk two months earlier. In place of the 17-minute-long segment was a disclaimer message from KOTV general manager Ron Longinotti explaining why the station would not air the segment, and an abbreviated local news insert. The decision—which was made directly by Belo management due to objections over the video's graphic content—fielded approximately 100 phone calls from viewers, most of which were critical of the move. The station also received criticism for preempting the final round of the PGA Tour's AT&T Pebble Beach National Pro-Am Tournament on February 7, 2000 (which was held on a Monday due to rain delays that suspended play the day prior) in favor of airing its regular daytime lineup of Maury and Oprah, preventing viewers from seeing Tiger Woods' comeback to 15-under-par to win that year's tournament. The criticism was amplified by the fact that a KOTV telephone receptionist told some viewers calling into the station that satellite transmission issues prevented the tournament round from being broadcast. Then-KOTV general manager Bud Brown claimed that the station would have lost more than $10,000 in advertising revenue and received "twice or three times as many complaints" had Oprah been preempted that day.

=== Sports programming ===
Seven years before Griffin Communications acquired the latter station, KOTV and KWTV in Oklahoma City partnered to simulcast three games involving the state's two Central Hockey League franchises, the Tulsa Oilers and the Oklahoma City Blazers, during the league's 1993–94 regular season; the respective sports directors of both stations at that time, Bill Teegins and John Walls, conducted play-by-play for the broadcasts, with KWTV sports anchor Ed Murray (who would later become a news anchor in 1999, and remain in that role until his retirement from television news in 2013) doing color commentary. From 1992 to 2014, KOTV maintained a broadcast partnership with the Sooner Sports Network, holding the local over-the-air broadcast rights to Oklahoma Sooners men's and women's college basketball games as well as weekly coaches programs for the Sooners' basketball and football teams produced through the University of Oklahoma's sports broadcasting unit.

In 2024, KOTV parent company Griffin Media reached an agreement to broadcast eight Oklahoma City Thunder games on KOTV's third subchannel.

=== News operation ===
Channel 6's news department began operations along with the station on October 22, 1949, originally consisting of 15-minute-long newscasts at noon and 6 p.m., and a half-hour newscast at 10 p.m. The newscasts were first anchored by Bob Hower, the first television news anchor in the Tulsa market, who opened that first newscast with the introduction, "Good evening, let's look at the news." At the time of its sign-on, in addition to his news duties, Hower served as KOTV's staff announcer as well as host of the station-produced game show Wishing Well. (After leaving KOTV following his recall into the Army to fight in the Korean War in the fall of 1950, Hower would eventually become known among Tulsa-area viewers during his tenure at KTUL from 1970 to 1986, during which he created the Waiting Child segment series – typically read Associated Press and United Press wire copy headlines – with still newspaper photographs being shown while reading some of the featured stories – four times a week.)

Clayton Vaughn joined KOTV as an anchor and assignment reporter in 1964, working off-and-on at the station for 33 years (with respective stints in Los Angeles and New York City interrupting his tenure at channel 6 from 1969 to 1971, and again from 1979 to 1981). He rejoined KOTV as main anchor of its evening newscasts in 1979, and took on additional duties as managing editor of the news department in 1984. In 1990, Vaughn – along with then-news director David Cassidy, KOTV and then-parent company Belo – was sued by Robert Joffe (an anchor and feature reporter who joined KOTV in 1986, and became known for his "You've Got a Friend" series that chronicled children and senior citizens in need of friendship) for $11 million. Joffe claimed he was fired by KOTV after Vaughn spread a rumor to station management that Joffe had a sexual liaison with a male hairstylist. Station manager Lee Salzberger stated that the firing resulted from "a [...] lack of confidence in his news and editorial judgment[,] doubts about his ability to effectively function as a news reporter[,] and his limited anchoring and reporting capabilities". In January 1992, Tulsa County District Court Judge Jane Wiseman granted a $4 million judgement to the estate of Joffe – who died from self-inflicted carbon monoxide poisoning in January 1991 – on charges of wrongful discharge, intentional infliction of emotional distress and interference with an employment contract (an additional claim of slander had earlier been dismissed). The ruling was upheld in two proceedings in the U.S. Court of Appeals for the Eastern District of Oklahoma and the Oklahoma Supreme Court. Vaughn remained primary co-anchor until February 28, 1997, when he shifted behind the scenes as full-time managing editor, a role Vaughn continued to hold until he retired from broadcasting in December 1998.

Jim Giles was a fixture for many years as KOTV's chief meteorologist, replacing the retiring Lee Woodward in 1981. During his tenure in the weather department, Giles helped gravitate KOTV to increase its emphasis on weather. He also received numerous awards for his charitable work, having started several community initiatives overseen by the station that help low-income residents, including "Giles' Coats for Kids" (a partnership with The Salvation Army Tulsa Area Command and local dry cleaners to collect donated winter coats and other winter clothing for needy Oklahomans). From 1984 to 2006, Giles and the KOTV weather staff presented the "[Jim Giles] Wild, Wild Weather Show", a weather education tour around Oklahoma communities during the spring and summer that included an hour-long show which taught tornado safety information and promoted the station's severe weather forecasting efforts. In 1991, Giles convinced station management to deploy an automated computer tracking application for use alongside its Doppler radar system; the "Pathfinder" application, which was developed by KOTV employee David Oldham and mirrored a similar application created by KWTV that same year, which projected the arrival time of precipitation at a particular location. In 1994, the station acquired a FirstLook Video system (produced and marketed by Broken Arrow-based PC Designs) that sent photos and near-real-time video over cell phone transmissions using a Macintosh computer combined with video compression codecs, allowing KOTV's news crews to send video of breaking news and severe weather events over mobile telephone relays for broadcast. Giles remained with KOTV until his retirement from broadcasting on November 21, 2006, citing existing health issues, including the advanced-stage liver cancer that would claim his life one month later on December 21; Travis Meyer – who had worked as a meteorologist at ABC affiliate KTUL since 1981 and spent his last 15 years at channel 8 as its chief meteorologist – joined KOTV as its weeknight 10 p.m. meteorologist on June 1, 2005, and subsequently took over as chief meteorologist the following day.

The station's morning newscast, Six in the Morning, debuted on July 14, 1990, as an hour-long broadcast at 6 a.m., displacing the CBS Morning News and first-run syndicated religious and news programs that had previously aired in that time period. Focusing mainly on local and national news, weather updates, interviews and lifestyle features, it was initially anchored by Rick Wells (who remained anchor of the program until 2002) and Julie Matsko. Channel 6 became the first Tulsa television station to air its morning newscast after 7 a.m. (predating the launch of KOKI's weekday morning newscast twelve years later) in September 1993, when it added a second hour of Six in the Morning and began tape delaying CBS This Morning by one hour. A straight news-based extension program, The News on 6: Morning Update, premiered on March 31, 1997 (this 5:30 a.m. broadcast was originally intended to debut on August 19, 1996, but plans for the expansion were suspended for nearly six months; that broadcast, which was eventually folded into the Six in the Morning banner, expanded into an hour-long broadcast at 5 a.m. on October 4, 2004). Other extensions to the newscast were made as time went on, with the addition of an 8 a.m. hour to the main broadcast on September 3, 1996, and the addition of a 4:30 a.m. half-hour on January 12, 2015. The program underwent a format change in November 2002, which retooled the entire broadcast as a more hard news-focused program, emphasized during the 6 a.m. hour. On December 6, 1993, KOTV expanded its noon newscast to one hour.

Since the station came under the ownership of Griffin Communications, KOTV has collaborated with Oklahoma City sister station KWTV to cover local news stories occurring in their respective markets. On August 26, 2001, KOTV premiered the Oklahoma Sports Blitz, a 45-minute-long (later reduced to 35 minutes) statewide sports news program created in partnership with KWTV and airs after the respective late evening newscasts on both stations, which features sports highlights, analysis and commentary and utilizes the resources of the KWTV and KOTV sports departments; it has been hosted since its debut by KOTV sports director John Holcomb and KWTV sports director Dean Blevins. In Tulsa, the program replaced Sunday Sports Special, a weekly sports highlight program (originally running for 15 minutes until September 1999, and then for 35 minutes thereafter) that premiered on KOTV in April 1988. The Sports Blitz has been criticized by Tulsa-area viewers for slanting its coverage toward University of Oklahoma and Oklahoma State University athletics and not including enough segments about Tulsa area sports teams. Under Griffin ownership, KOTV outfitted its photojournalists with the first digital video cameras in the market.

In April 2006, KOTV debuted a retrofitted Bell JetRanger helicopter for aerial newsgathering (branded as "SkyNews 6", later altered to "Osage SkyNews 6" through a brand licensing agreement with Osage Casino in 2014). KWTV management had sold the helicopter, which it had operated for years under the "Ranger 9" moniker and was fitted with a gyroscopic-zoom camera mounted under the aircraft's nose in 2001, to KOTV after the Oklahoma City station purchased a $1.5-million Bell 407 helicopter equipped with an optical high-definition camera (branded as "SkyNews9 HD"). The two helicopters are occasionally used by both stations to collaborate on aerial coverage of breaking news and severe weather events in areas where the Oklahoma City and Tulsa markets overlap. The helicopter crashed in a field near William R. Pogue Municipal Airport in Sand Springs on June 20, 2007, while it was making a low-level pass above a station ENG truck on the far west side of the airport's main runway during the filming of a station promo, with the rotors of the chopper clipping a satellite antenna near the truck's front end. The out-of-control chopper went down about 100 yards (91 m) east of the truck's position and left a debris field scattered over several hundred feet to the south edge of the runway (the helicopter's main fuselage and rear assembly crashlanded about 30 feet (9 m) away from the tail and rotary blades that had broken away prior to impact). Chopper pilot Joseph Lester (who suffered a head laceration, a minor leg injury and some bruises) and station photographer Nicholas Stone (who escaped without injury) survived the accident. The helicopter was replaced on May 5, 2008, incorporating an additional microprocessor-controlled gyro camera on the craft's tail (branded as "SteadiZoom 360"), which allows for showcasing the chopper's side in profile on the left side of the screen, while showing on-scene footage on the right; further upgrades to "SkyNews 6" were made on July 1, 2014, with the installation of a camera capable of shooting high-definition video.

On September 18, 2006, following the closure of Griffin's purchase of that station from the Cascade Broadcasting Group and coinciding with the station's affiliation change to The CW, KOTV began producing a weeknight-only, half-hour newscast at 9 p.m. for KQCW. (The program was expanded to include Saturday and Sunday editions on October 27, 2007, with the weeknight editions expanding to one hour on June 17, 2013; the Saturday and Sunday editions would also expand to an hour five years later, in September 2018.) It directly competes against Fox affiliate KOKI's established hour-long prime time newscast, which had become the ratings leader in that time slot in the years since that program's debut upon the February 2002 launch of channel 23's news department. KOTV subsequently added a weekday morning newscast to KQCW on January 7, 2008, when the 8 a.m. hour of Six in the Morning was migrated to that station to allow channel 6 to comply with carriage requirements implemented by CBS at the beginning of the year that required its affiliates to carry the full two-hour broadcast of The Early Show (which was replaced by CBS This Morning in January 2012).

In November 2008, KOTV expanded the Saturday edition of its 10 p.m. newscast to a full hour, titling the 10:30 half-hour as News on 6 Late Edition (Oklahoma City sister station KWTV-DT had similarly expanded its Saturday 10 p.m. newscast to one hour the year prior). On October 24, 2010, beginning with the 9 p.m. newscast on KQCW, KOTV introduced new on-air graphics designed by Hothaus Creative Design, a new station logo (a rounded red square with a "6" in Goudy type, an upside image of the logo adopted by KWTV) and a new slogan ("Oklahoma's Own"), which – along with "The CBS Enforcer Music Collection" news package by Gari Media Group (which KOTV has used since 2006) – was also adopted by Oklahoma City sister station KWTV on that same date. Although its Oklahoma City sister station KWTV upgraded its news programming to high definition with the adoption of the new standardized look, the KOTV and KQCW newscasts were upgraded only to 16:9 widescreen standard definition as the age of the South Frankfort Avenue facility as well as the pending construction of the Brady District facility prevented the duopoly from upgrading its news production to HD at that time.

On January 19, 2013, KOTV and KQCW became the last two television stations in the Tulsa market to upgrade production of their local newscasts to full high definition. With the completion of the duopoly's operational migration into the Griffin Communications Media Center on that date, the KOTV-KQCW news department began utilizing an upgraded Avid MediaCentral platform to provide a digitized, collaborative news workflow that eased access to content from Oklahoma City sister station KWTV to transfer, store and edit for inclusion into their newscasts. On July 5, 2014, KOTV expanded its 6 p.m. newscast on Saturday evenings to one hour, after Discover Oklahoma (a statewide-syndicated program produced by the Oklahoma Department of Tourism and Recreation) moved to KTUL. On March 21, 2015, KOTV debuted weekend editions of Six in the Morning, originally anchored by Erin Conrad and meteorologist Stacia Knight; the broadcasts run for two hours from 8 to 10 a.m. on Saturdays and with a one-hour edition on Sundays on 6 to 7 a.m., becoming the third television station in the Tulsa market (after KJRH-TV, which launched its own weekend morning newscasts in January 2004, and KOKI-TV, which launched theirs on January 4, 2014) to carry a morning news program on weekends.

For many years, KOTV's newscasts resided at a strong second place (behind KTUL) among viewership totals for the market's local television news operations. This streak continued until 1999, when KOTV overtook KTUL as the most-watched television news outlet in Tulsa. KOTV's news broadcasts continue to win all time periods by comfortable margins, largely aided by the strengths of CBS's prime time programming. In November 2007, the station's 10 p.m. newscast was the eighth highest-rated late newscast in the United States.

=== Notable on-air staff ===
==== Current staff ====
- Travis Meyer, chief meteorologist

==== Former staff ====
- John Anderson – sports anchor (1990–1996)
- Chuck Bowman – announcer (late 1950s–1960s)
- Betty Boyd – host of The Woman's Page (1955–1965)
- Denny Delk – staff announcer (1960s–1970s)
- Mike Flynn – news anchor/reporter/musician (1970s)
- Jim Giles – chief meteorologist (1981–2006)
- Jim Hartz – news anchor (1962–1964)
- Bob Losure – anchor (late 1970s–early 1980s)
- Spanky McFarland – host of children's program Spanky's Clubhouse (1957–1959)
- Cameron Sanders – reporter (1981–1982)
- Gailard Sartain – host of The Uncanny Film Festival and Camp Meeting (1970–1974)
- Harry Volkman – meteorologist (1950–1952)

== Technical information ==
=== Subchannels ===
KOTV-DT's primary transmitter is located on South 273rd East Avenue (just north of the Muskogee Turnpike) in Broken Arrow, Oklahoma. The station's signal is multiplexed:

Subchannels of KOTV-DT
Subchannel	Res.	Short name	Programming
6.1	1080i	KOTV-HD	CBS
6.3	480i	NewsOn6	News on 6 Now

=== Analog-to-digital conversion ===
KOTV began transmitting a digital television signal under special temporary authorization on UHF channel 55 on May 1, 2002. Cox Communications began carrying KOTV's high-definition feed on digital channel 716 throughout its Tulsa service area on December 17, 2004, initially transmitting it daily from noon to midnight.

KOTV shut down its analog signal, over VHF channel 6, on February 17, 2009, the original date on which full-power television stations in the United States were to transition from analog to digital broadcasts under federal mandate. The station's digital signal operated on a high-band UHF channel (in the 52 to 69 channel range) that was removed from broadcast use after the official June 12, 2009, transition date, its analog channel assignment was in the low-band VHF range (channels 2 to 6) and therefore prone to signal interference from impulse noise. The station selected UHF channel 45 for its post-transition digital operations; digital television receivers display the station's virtual channel as its former VHF analog channel 6.

=== Translators ===
Two digital replacement translators, one to the south and one to the north, provide service in areas that had previously been served in analog from the main transmitter.

- KOTV-DT (DRT) 19 McAlester
- KOTV-DT (DRT) 30 Caney, Kansas
