= KTPX-TV =

Television station in Okmulgee, Oklahoma

- Okmulgee–Tulsa, Oklahoma; United States
- City: Okmulgee, Oklahoma
- Channels: Digital: 28 (UHF); Virtual: 44

Programming
- Affiliations: 2.11: NBC (KJRH-TV simulcast); 44.1: Ion Television; for others, see § Subchannels

Ownership
- Owner: Ion Media; (Ion Television License, LLC)
- Sister stations: KJRH-TV

History
- First air date: July 1997
- Former call signs: KGLB-TV (1997–1998)
- Former channel numbers: Analog: 44 (UHF, 1997–2009)
- Former affiliations: inTV (1997–1998)
- Call sign meaning: Tulsa's Pax TV (reflecting network's former branding)

Technical information
- Licensing authority: FCC
- Facility ID: 7078
- ERP: 1,000 kW
- HAAT: 219 m (719 ft)
- Transmitter coordinates: 35°50′2″N 96°7′29″W

Links
- Public license information: Public file; LMS
- Website: iontelevision.com

KTPX-TV (channel 44) is a television station licensed to Okmulgee, Oklahoma, United States, serving as the Ion Television outlet for the Tulsa area. It is owned by the Ion Media subsidiary of the E. W. Scripps Company alongside NBC affiliate KJRH-TV (channel 2). KTPX-TV's offices are located on East Skelly Drive in Tulsa, and its transmitter is located near Mounds, Oklahoma.

== History ==
The station first signed on the air on July 1997, as KGLB-TV; it originally carried programming from Paxson Communications' infomercial service, the Infomall Television Network (inTV). The station became a charter owned-and-operated station of Pax TV (now Ion Television) when the network launched on August 31, 1998; on January 13 of that year, the station changed its call letters to KTPX-TV (the KTPX calls were previously used by NBC affiliate KWES-TV in Midland, Texas, from 1981 to 1993).

=== Sale to Scripps ===
On September 24, 2020, the Cincinnati-based E. W. Scripps Company announced that it would purchase Ion Media for $2.65 billion, with financing from Berkshire Hathaway. The purchase made KTPX-TV a sister station to NBC affiliate KJRH-TV (channel 2). The sale was completed on January 7, 2021.

On February 27, 2021, KTPX-DT2 began to simulcast KJRH's main schedule, and was re-mapped to channel 2.11.

== Programming ==
KTPX airs the entire Ion schedule and since the repeal of the Main Studio Rule, it carries the network without any local content outside of an hourly on-screen station identification; the station is also not currently used by KJRH to carry preempted NBC and syndicated programming.

=== Newscasts ===
Until 2005, KTPX aired rebroadcasts of KJRH-TV's 6 p.m. and 10 p.m. newscasts at 6:30 p.m. and 10:30 p.m. on tape delay.

== Technical information ==
=== Subchannels ===
The station's signal is multiplexed:

Subchannels of KTPX-TV
Subchannel	Res.	Short name	Programming
2.11	720p	KJRH	NBC (KJRH-TV)
44.1	720p	ION	Ion Television
44.3	480i	CourtTV	Court TV
44.4	480i	MOVIES!	Movies!
44.5	480i	Mystery	Ion Mystery
44.6	480i	GameSho	Game Show Central
44.7	480i	QVC	QVC
44.8	480i	HSN	HSN

Simulcast of subchannels of another station

=== Analog-to-digital conversion ===
KTPX-TV shut down its analog signal, over UHF channel 44, on June 12, 2009, the official date on which full-power television stations in the United States transitioned from analog to digital broadcasts under federal mandate. The station's digital signal remained on its pre-transition UHF channel 28, using virtual channel 44.
