= KQCW-DT =

Television station in Muskogee, Oklahoma

- Muskogee–Tulsa, Oklahoma; United States
- City: Muskogee, Oklahoma
- Channels: Digital: 20 (UHF); Virtual: 19
- Branding: Tulsa CW

Programming
- Affiliations: 19.1: The CW; 19.2: MovieSphere Gold; 19.3: Shop LC

Ownership
- Owner: Griffin Media; (Griffin Licensing, L.L.C.)
- Sister stations: TV: KOTV-DT; Radio: KRQV; KOTV; KHTT; KVOO-FM; KXBL

History
- Founded: August 27, 1998
- First air date: September 12, 1999
- Former call signs: KWBT (1999–2006); KQCW (2006–2009)
- Former channel numbers: Analog: 19 (UHF, 1999–2009)
- Former affiliations: The WB (1999–2006)

Technical information
- Licensing authority: FCC
- Facility ID: 78322
- ERP: 700 kW
- HAAT: 432 m (1,417 ft)
- Transmitter coordinates: 36°1′15″N 95°40′33″W
- Translator(s): K15LM-D McAlester

Links
- Public license information: Public file; LMS

KQCW-DT (channel 19) is a television station licensed to Muskogee, Oklahoma, United States, serving the Tulsa area as an affiliate of The CW. It is owned by Griffin Media alongside CBS affiliate KOTV-DT (channel 6). The two stations share studios at the Griffin Media Center on North Boston Avenue and East Cameron Street in the downtown neighborhood's Tulsa Arts District; KQCW-DT's transmitter is located on South 273rd East Avenue (just north of the Muskogee Turnpike) in Broken Arrow, Oklahoma.

Channel 19 began broadcasting on September 12, 1999, as KWBT, Tulsa's first full-time affiliate of The WB. It was owned by Cascade Communications, which had acquired an interest from a consortium of three groups that sought the channel. In 2005, the station was acquired by Griffin Media, which consolidated it with KOTV's operation. The WB and UPN merged to form The CW in 2006; KWBT became KQCW, the market's affiliate for the merged network, and debuted local newscasts produced by KOTV.

== History ==
=== Establishment ===
In late 1995 and early 1996, several groups filed to build stations on the channel 19 allocation in Muskogee, southeast of Tulsa: KM Communications, Northwest Television, and Natura Communications. The groups merged their bids into Tulsa Channel 19 LLC in a settlement window for mutually exclusive applications opened by the Federal Communications Commission (FCC) and were granted a construction permit on August 27, 1998. On March 9, 1999, Larkspur, California–based Tulsa Communications LLC purchased a 51 percent controlling stake in KWBT for $4.59 million; the sale was finalized on June 1, 1999.

The programming of The WB had generally been unavailable to many Tulsa viewers since its launch in 1995. While Superstation WGN—a service uplinked by Tulsa-based United Video—aired WB programming nationally, the Tele-Communications Inc. cable system in Tulsa had not carried the channel since the end of 1996. Further, The WB and United Video mutually agreed to drop WB programming from the superstation feed in 1999 to reduce redundancy with the growing roster of WB affiliates and preemptions of WGN's sports programming.

Channel 19 debuted as KWBT ("WB Tulsa"), the market's first full-time WB affiliate, on September 12, 1999. It offered WB series as well as syndicated programs. In its premiere week, the station aired reruns of WB programs previously unseen in Tulsa, such as 7th Heaven and Dawson's Creek. KWBT was initially placed on cable channel 19 but moved to channel 12 in 2000 after the station reached a deal with Rogers State University, whose KRSC-TV occupied cable channel 12, to switch in exchange for scholarships and internships for the university's communications students. The parent company of KWBT, Cascade Communications, also established the university's first endowed chair, named for company founder Greg Kunz. Cascade transferred master control operations from its Tulsa facilities to its corporate office in Tucson, Arizona, in early 2004, resulting in eight layoffs.

KWBT carried the ABC late-night talk show Jimmy Kimmel Live! from April 2003 to April 2004; Tulsa's ABC affiliate, KTUL, had declined to air the program and aired syndicated shows in the time slot it would otherwise occupy.

KWBT's final logo as a WB affiliate, used from September 2004 to August 2006.

=== Griffin ownership ===
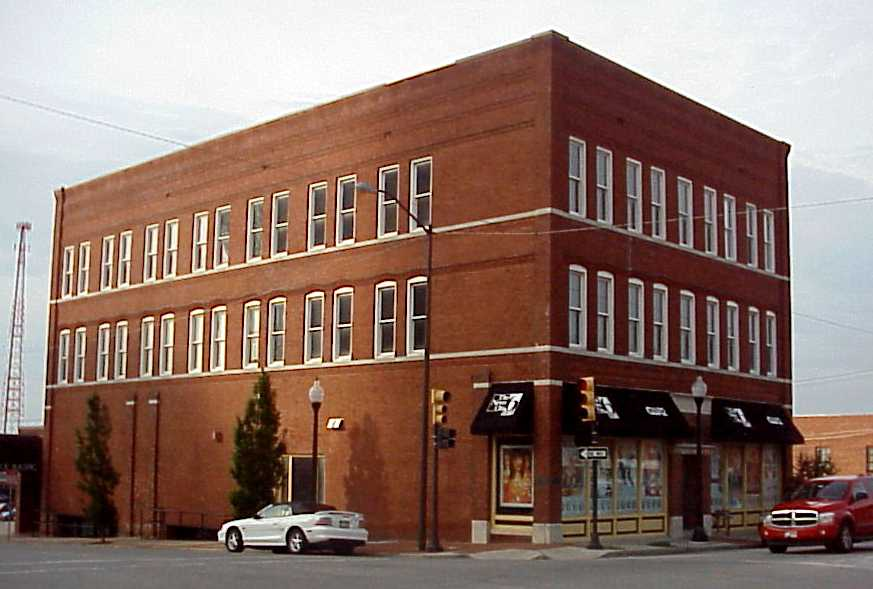
The historic Pierce Block in Tulsa housed the KOTV–KQCW sales department until 2013.

On October 8, 2005, Cascade announced the $14.5 million sale of KWBT to Griffin Communications, the Oklahoma City–based owner of local CBS affiliate KOTV (channel 6). Griffin immediately assumed operational control under a joint sales agreement. Griffin consolidated KQCW with KOTV's burgeoning operation, which was rapidly outgrowing its downtown Tulsa studios; Griffin rented office space in the city's historic Pierce Block for the KOTV sales department.

The WB and UPN announced their intention to merge into The CW on January 24, 2006. KWBT was announced as the CW affiliate for the market in April and changed its call sign to KQCW; the UPN affiliate, KTFO, signed with rival MyNetworkTV.

In January 2006, KWBT signed a contract with the Tulsa Talons, an arena football team in the second-tier AF2 league, whose games had aired the year before on KWHB (channel 47). Talons co-owner Henry Primeaux cited KWHB's telecasts of the sixteen games played during the 2005 regular season as a partial cause of a 14 percent year-to-year increase in ticket sales that year. Following the move to KWBT, ratings for Talons home games declined sharply; the team's four early-season road games of the 2006 season producing higher viewership compared to the remainder of the schedule, while the home telecasts barely managed to register a ratings point. Midway through the season, the Talons dropped the remaining home telecasts from the lineup.

To house the growing Griffin Tulsa operation, the company acquired a parcel downtown and broke ground on a new studio and office complex in April 2008. Construction was halted due to the Great Recession but resumed in 2011. The 50,000-square-foot (4,645 m^{2}) Griffin Communications Media Center opened in 2013.

== Newscasts ==
Coinciding with the launch of The CW, KOTV debuted a half-hour, weeknight 9 p.m. newscast for the station on September 18, 2006. It competed with the newscast in the same time slot aired by Fox affiliate KOKI-TV. The newscast was expanded to weekends in October 2007 and to an hour on weeknights in 2013. By 2023, the station simulcast the 6 a.m. hour of KOTV's Six in the Morning and aired a two-hour extension from 7 to 9 a.m., in addition to the hour-long 9 p.m. newscast.

== Technical information ==
=== Subchannels ===
KQCW's transmitter is located on South 273rd East Avenue (just north of the Muskogee Turnpike) in Broken Arrow, Oklahoma. The station's signal is multiplexed:

Subchannels of KQCW-DT
Subchannel	Res.	Short name	Programming
19.1	1080i	KQCW-HD	The CW
19.2	720p	MSphere	MovieSphere Gold
19.3	480i	ShopLC	Shop LC

=== Analog-to-digital conversion ===
Because it was granted an original construction permit after the FCC finalized the digital television allotment plan on April 21, 1997, the station did not receive a companion channel for its digital signal. Instead, on February 17, 2009, during the first round of broadcast stations ceasing analog operations on the originally scheduled date of the digital television conversion period for full-power stations, KQCW was required to turn off its analog signal and turn on its digital signal (a method called a "flash-cut"). KQCW elected to choose UHF channel 20 as its final digital channel selection and began digital broadcasts that day. Digital television receivers display the station's virtual channel as its former UHF analog channel 19.

KQCW was also broadcast as the 6.2 subchannel of KOTV until March 29, 2026.
