= News 9 Now and News on 6 Now =

News 9 Now / News on 6 Now
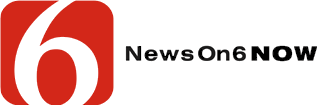
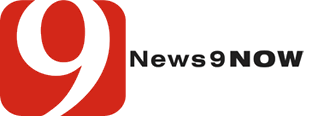
- Country: United States
- Broadcast area: Oklahoma
- Headquarters: Oklahoma City, Oklahoma

Programming
- Language: English
- Picture format: KWTV: 720p (HD); KOTV: 480p (EDTV)

Ownership
- Owner: Griffin Media (1996–present); Cox Communications Oklahoma (1996–2011)

History
- Launched: December 3, 1996 (as News Now 53); April 1, 2011 (relaunch; as News 9 Now and News on 6 Now)
- Former names: News Now 53 (1996–2011)

Links
- Website: www.news9.com (KWTV) www.newson6.com (KOTV)

Availability

Terrestrial
- Oklahoma City: KWTV-DT 9.2
- Tulsa: KOTV-DT 6.3

News 9 Now and News on 6 Now are American regional digital broadcast television networks that are owned by Griffin Media. The channels simulcast and rebroadcast local news programming seen on Griffin-owned CBS affiliates KWTV-DT (channel 9) in Oklahoma City and KOTV-DT (channel 6) in Tulsa, Oklahoma in their respective markets, along with select other programs. News 9 Now is broadcast on KWTV digital subchannel 9.2 in the Oklahoma City market, while News on 6 Now is broadcast on KOTV digital subchannel 6.3 in the Tulsa market. On cable, the individual channels are available on Cox Communications channel 53 in their respective markets.

The services were developed out of News Now 53, a regional cable news channel that operated from December 1996 to April 2011, which was operated by Cox Communications Oklahoma in conjunction with Griffin Communications, and was carried on cable systems within Cox's Oklahoma service area.

== Background ==
=== News Now 53 ===
The concept of the channel dates back to the August 1993 extension of a retransmission consent agreement made between KWTV and Oklahoma City area cable providers Cox Cable (which rebranded as Cox Communications in 1996) and Multimedia Cablevision (whose systems in suburban areas of the city were acquired by Cox in 2000) to continue carriage of the station's signal; as part of the deal, KWTV announced that it would create a locally originated cable channel providing news, sports and weather information for the two providers.

The service, which was named News Now 53, first launched on December 3, 1996, exclusively on Cox's systems in Oklahoma City and certain inner suburbs; it aired both live airings and rebroadcasts of KWTV's daily local news programs as well as occasional specials produced by the station's news department. Following Griffin's 2000 acquisition of KOTV from the Belo Corporation, News Now 53 expanded to Cox's Tulsa service area, carrying live daily newscasts and news replays from KOTV.

Original "News Now 53" logo, used from 1996 to 2001.

Until the mid-2000s, News Now 53 carried live telecasts of KWTV – and later KOTV's newscasts – in the event that either station was unable to air its regularly scheduled evening newscasts due to CBS sports telecasts that run into that timeslot. In 2008, the channel underwent a graphical revamp, with the introduction of a new logo and the implementation of a new "L" bar (which was an expansion to the graphical display that featured only the current time and temperature as well as notifications regarding the newscast that was being rebroadcast at that time), displaying five-day forecasts for the respective markets, along with banner advertisements for Cox Communications and local area businesses. This "L" bar – which evolved into its current format displaying current conditions and 24-hour forecasts for various weather observation sites around Oklahoma on the lower portion of the screen with banner ads remaining on the right-hand portion – only appears during rebroadcasts of KWTV/KOTV newscasts and is removed for commercial breaks and live broadcasts – though technical errors occasionally result in the "L" bar display not appearing during some news rebroadcasts.

=== Relaunch as News 9 Now and News on 6 Now ===
On April 1, 2011, Griffin Communications took over the operations of News Now 53 from Cox Communications, and both the Oklahoma City and Tulsa area feeds of News Now 53 were reformatted into two separate services: News 9 Now and News on 6 Now; along with the existing cable coverage, both feeds began to be broadcast over-the-air for the first time as multicast channels of KWTV and KOTV's digital signals, and allowed cable providers in the state outside of Cox Communications to carry the channel. In the Tulsa area, the launch of News on 6 Now on KOTV digital channel 6.3, resulted in the movie-oriented digital broadcast network This TV to be relocated to digital channel 19.2 of KOTV's CW-affiliated sister station KQCW-DT.

The channels broadcast KOTV and KWTV's newscasts in 16:9 widescreen, as both KWTV and KOTV broadcast their newscasts in that format (both stations broadcast their news programming in high definition, with KOTV upgrading from enhanced definition to HD in January 2013, although the two channels broadcast programming in downconverted 480i standard definition); however, news rebroadcasts on News 9 Now are shown in a stretched center cut 4:3 display.

On April 12, 2011, Cox restricted the channels to its digital service; this required customers in the Oklahoma City and Tulsa markets with analog-only cable service to rent a CableCARD or digital cable converter, or purchase a television set with a digital cable-ready QAM tuner to continue to receive News 9 Now and News on 6 Now programming.

== Programming ==
With the relaunch of News Now 53 as two individually-branded services, plans originally called for KWTV and KOTV to use the channels to provide additional coverage during severe weather events; however in such cases, the channels instead take on the responsibility of broadcasting CBS network and syndicated programs normally seen on the main channel during extended breaking news and severe weather coverage. (although it's expected to eventually be discontinued as Griffin purchased Oklahoma City's MyNetworkTV affiliate KSBI with KSBI taking over responsibilities in airing CBS Programing when KWTV is unable to do so).

Although News 9 and News on 6 Now are intended to operate as news rebroadcast channels, the two services also carry a three-hour block of children's programs on Saturday mornings, in order to comply with Federal Communications Commission educational programming rules that require digital subchannels to carry additional educational programming, regardless of the subchannel's intended format. News 9 Now formerly broadcasts CBS This Morning Saturday in lieu of KWTV and Face the Nation in its entirety as KWTV does not broadcast the second half-hour of the program live from the CBS network feed (the first half-hour airs on Sunday mornings in tandem with News 9 Now's broadcast of the program, while KWTV's main channel airs the second half of the program on a tape delay on Sunday nights/early Monday mornings).
