= Perry Publishing and Broadcasting =

American print media and radio broadcasting company

- Industry: Print media; Radio broadcasting
- Founded: April 1979; 47 years ago
- Headquarters: Oklahoma City, Oklahoma, United States
- Key people: Russell M. Perry (founder and former president); Kevin S. Perry (president/CEO)
- Website: www.perrybroadcasting.net

Perry Publishing and Broadcasting is an American print media and radio broadcasting company based in Oklahoma City, Oklahoma, targeting the local African American community.

On the 7th of April 2025 the Oklahoma Senate passed Senate Resolution 13, honoring Russell M. Perry for his remarkable contributions to the state as a businessman, banker, and journalist. Authored and presented by Senator Shane Jett, state of Oklahoma, who is the state senator from Senate District 17, which includes northern Pottawatomie County and eastern Oklahoma County. The resolution commended Perry for founding The Black Chronicle and establishing Perry Publishing & Broadcasting, now Oklahoma’s largest independent radio group.

== Company history ==
Perry Publishing and Broadcasting was founded in April 1979 by Russell M. Perry and began publishing the Black Chronicle, Oklahoma's oldest African-American community newspaper, that same month.

In 1993, Perry Publishing acquired its first radio station with the purchase of AM 1140 (now known as KRMP) in Oklahoma City. Then acquired KVSP and became the first urban contemporary station in the Oklahoma City market since the early-1990s. With the success of KVSP, Perry soon acquired KJMM in Tulsa in 1994.

In 1996, Perry Publishing acquired its first duopoly with KJMZ and KKRX, serving the Lawton area.

In 1999, Perry Publishing purchased KGTO in Tulsa from Cox Radio, providing the company a duopoly in Tulsa along with KJMM.

In 2001, Perry Publishing acquired five more stations serving the Lawton area: KKEN, KDDQ, KRPT, KPNS, and KXCA.

In 2005, Perry then acquired KACO, which also serving the Lawton area.

In August 2007, Perry Publishing acquired Radio One's cluster of stations in Augusta, Georgia: WFXA-FM, WAKB, WTHB, and WAEG.

In November 2015, it was announced that Perry Publishing purchased KFMD in Bethel Heights, Arkansas from Hog Radio for $400,000.

In December 2018, Perry Publishing announced that it would sell all 8 of his station in the Lawton area to Mollman Media for $3 million. The sale was completed in April 2019.

== Radio stations ==
=== Arkansas ===
==== Bethel Heights ====
- KQIS 105.3/1340 AM Urban contemporary

=== Georgia ===
==== Augusta ====
- WAEG 92.3 Smooth jazz
- WAKB 100.9 Urban adult contemporary
- WFXA-FM 103.1 Mainstream urban
- WTHB-FM 96.9 Urban gospel

=== Oklahoma ===
==== Oklahoma City (flagship) ====
- KINB 105.3 Sports radio
- KRMP 1140 AM Urban adult contemporary
- KVSP 103.5 Mainstream urban

==== Tulsa, Oklahoma ====
- KGTO 1050 AM Urban adult contemporary
- KJMM 105.3 Mainstream urban
