= KJMM =

Radio station in Bixby, Oklahoma, United States

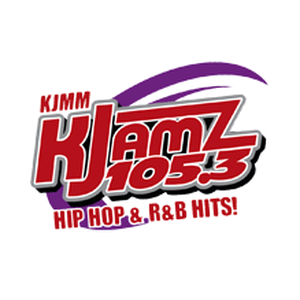
- Bixby, Oklahoma; United States
- Broadcast area: Tulsa metropolitan area
- Frequency: 105.3 MHz
- Branding: 105 K-Jamz

Programming
- Format: Mainstream urban

Ownership
- Owner: Perry Publishing and Broadcasting
- Sister stations: KGTO

History
- First air date: January 31, 1995
- Call sign meaning: Jam Music

Technical information
- Licensing authority: FCC
- Facility ID: 35015
- Class: C2
- ERP: 10,000 watts
- HAAT: 268 meters (879 ft)
- Transmitter coordinates: type:city 35°51′41.00″N 95°46′3.00″W

Links
- Public license information: Public file; LMS
- Webcast: Listen live
- Website: www.kjmm.com

KJMM (105.3 FM) is a commercial radio station licensed to Bixby, Oklahoma, United States, and serving the Greater Tulsa market. Owned by Perry Publishing and Broadcasting, it features a mainstream urban format. KJMM's studios are located in the Copper Oaks complex in South Tulsa.

The transmitter site is located on South 186th Street East in Haskell, Oklahoma.

== History ==
KJMM signed on the air on January 31, 1995. It was one of three original Urban stations launched with the help of Perry Broadcasting, an African-American-based media company. KJMM is part of the "Power Jammin'" network, along with KVSP in Oklahoma City and KJMZ in Lawton.

The owner believed the African-American community was underserved in the radio media. At that point there was one FM radio station aimed at the Tulsa African-American community. It was KTOW-FM Sand Springs, "Mix 102.3" (now talk radio KRMG-FM). Its DJs were KK Holliday 7pm-12am, Danny Drake 3pm-7pm afternoon drive and later in the afternoons, it was Keith Sergio Samuels aka Sergio Lacour, Angel Craig 10am-3pm and Aaron Bernard 6am-10am and Nikki 12am-6am. Perry offered better salaries and took most of the DJs from Mix 102.3, hiring them to establish his competitor station on 105.3 MHz.

Logo under former slogan

The station plays Hip Hop, R&B, Rap and Urban Gospel on Sunday mornings. It was originally called Fresh Jamz 105. In 2004, KJMM changed its moniker to 105.3 K-Jamz. It began carrying "The Doug Banks Morning Show," while sending the previously aired morning drive program, "The Tom Joyner Morning Show" to sister station KGTO, an Urban AC station at 1050AM which at the time was known as “The Touch 1050” as it was a part of “The Touch” syndicated network. In December 2007, KJMM became the new affiliate of the Los Angeles-based "Big Boy's Neighborhood," replacing Doug Banks. "The Rickey Smiley Morning Show" later replaced Big Boy's Neighborhood in the morning on KJMM.

In January 2020, "The Rickey Smiley Morning Show" was sent to sister station KGTO after Tom Joyner retired in December 2019. Because of this KJMM became an affiliate of the new syndicated urban morning show "The Morning Hustle" hosted by rapper and former cast member on The Rickey Smiley Morning Show, Headkrack. His co-host is rapper Lore’l. “The Morning Hustle” airs from 5 to 9 a.m. weekdays. Together under the advisory of APD Aaron Bernard and with the lessons from veteran Cee Foxx they changed radio in Tulsa. The current weekday lineup is the nationally syndicated “The Morning Hustle” now hosted by Kyle Santillian who used to be a co host on the morning show on 107.5 WGCI-FM in Chicago as well as Lore’l from 5 to 9 a.m..Local Personality Midwest B.J does the afternoon drive 2 to 6 p.m..
