= KRMG =

KRMG may refer to:

- KRMG (AM), a radio station (740 AM) licensed to Tulsa, Oklahoma, United States
- KRMG-FM, a radio station (96.5 FM) licensed to Sand Springs, Oklahoma, United States
- Richard B. Russell Airport, an airport in Rome, Georgia, United States, assigned the ICAO code KRMG
