= The Z Twins =

The Z Twins is a couple of radio stations owned by the Seattle Medium, an African American newspaper that serves the Seattle area:

- KRIZ 1420 AM
- KYIZ 1620 AM
