= Brandon Jenkins (musician) =

American singer-songwriter

- Born: June 7, 1969; Tulsa, Oklahoma, U.S.
- Died: March 2, 2018 (aged 48); Nashville, Tennessee, U.S.
- Education: Oklahoma State University
- Occupations: Singer; songwriter; philanthropist
- Years active: 1994–2018
- Spouse: Michele Jenkins
- Musical career
- Genres: Red Dirt; Texas Country
- Labels: Rainy Records; Red Dirt Legend Recordings; Remorseless Records; Explosive Records; Thirty Tigers; Smith Entertainment; E1 Music
- Website: brandonjenkins.com

Brandon Dean Jenkins (June 7, 1969 – March 2, 2018) was an American singer-songwriter and philanthropist. He was part of the Red Dirt music genre.

Jenkins performed in the Texas and Oklahoma regions, and he toured Europe on several occasions. He often played 150 shows per year and shared the stage with Cross Canadian Ragweed, Sunny Sweeney, Zane Williams, Cory Morrow, Deana Carter, Pat Green, Willie Nelson, The Mavericks, and Kevin Welch.

One of Jenkins' notable songs, "Refinery Blues," was a biographical ballad about growing up near the Sand Springs Line, an area where oil refineries abound near the Arkansas River tributary of the Mississippi River.

Jenkins was also a philanthropist as a supporter of the Red Dirt Relief Fund, a non-profit organization that supports musicians from the Red Dirt family of artists who face financial hardship.

== Early life ==
Jenkins was born in Tulsa, Oklahoma, to parents Wilma Jenkins (née Linthicum) and Dean Jenkins, a popular Tulsa radio disc jockey on stations KELi (where he was known as Dean Kelly) and KMOD-FM.

In 1987, Jenkins graduated from Central High School in Tulsa, where he was in the jazz band, sang in the choir, and taught himself guitar. In the 1980s, He attended Oklahoma State University in Stillwater. During his time at OSU, Jenkins made life-long friends with many of his long-term musical collaborators in the Red Dirt Music community, including Cody Canada, Mike McClure, Stoney LaRue, and Bleu Edmondson.

Jenkins' uncle was the Grammy Award-winning bass player, sound engineer, and producer, Gordon Shryock, who was known for his work with J. J. Cale and Leon Russell, as well as Andrae Crouch, Elvis Presley, Natalie Cole, and Dwight Yoakam.

== Career ==
In the early 1990s, Jenkins got his start recording for the Alabama-based record label, Rainy Records.

In 2003, Jenkins moved from Oklahoma to Austin, Texas, where he lived until 2015.

In 2005, Jenkins released Down in Flames and got a 3-year record deal for his Western Soul Records imprint to have his work distributed by Sony/RED. The record came out on the Thirty Tigers label.

In 2008, Jenkins released Faster Than a Stone, which featured Travis Fite and Stoney LaRue.

Jenkins' 2009 album Brothers of the Dirt was a collaboration with many Red Dirt and Texas country scene artists: Cody Canada (Cross Canadian Ragweed), Stoney LaRue, Jason Boland, and Randy Rogers. The record was his first release on the independent label E1 Entertainment/Red Dirt Music Co. The song, "Out of Babylon," sung by Jenkins and Canada, was a tribute to 9/11, while the song, "Innocent Man," is a LaRue and Rogers contribution inspired by the John Grisham novel about Ron Williamson, The Innocent Man: Murder and Injustice in a Small Town. The song, "Blood for Oil," was a protest song that focuses on George W. Bush's involvement with Iraq War.

In 2011, Jenkins released a record he called Project Eleven, which was a digital only 11-track record released on the 10th anniversary of 9/11, with a single released on September 11, 2011.

In 2015, Jenkins released the record, Blue Bandana, which was recorded over a period of two days in David Percefull's Yellow Dog Studios with a full band capturing a live sound in one day and the engineering and mastering done over the next day. The record was released in a digital only format, with a limited number of physical versions available.

Also in 2015, Jenkins released Brandon Jenkins @ Radio Recorders, which he recorded for Pride Hutchison and Dale Lawton's Tulsa-based label, Explosive Records. The record was made in 2006 in the Southern California record studio called Radio Recorders. Since Jenkins' music was firmly in the Texas country genre, this record was held onto for release, some nine years later.

Jenkins recorded The Flag, in 2016 which again with long-time collaborator, Dave Percefull. This was recorded in Wimberley, Texas, in the Texas Hill Country, and features Dony Wynn, Bukka Allen (son of Terry Allen) on accordion, and Kim Deschamps on lap steel and dobro. In 2016, Jenkins moved from Austin to Nashville, Tennessee, where his career would be based from until his death in 2018.

=== Songwriting ===
Jenkins' song "My Feet Don't Touch The Ground" was featured on Pete Anderson's 2003 A Country West of Nashville album. The song garnered him an Emerging Artists in Music Award. The song was placed 8th on the list of "The 50 Best Red Dirt Texas Country Songs" of the Dallas Observer, and helped his career significantly.

Fellow Red Dirt artists Bleu Edmondson ("Finger on the Trigger") and Stoney LaRue ("Feet Don't Touch The Ground") recorded and performed songs written by Jenkins. The song, "Feet Don't Touch The Ground," was praised by KKCN as being one of the top 5 recorded songs by Stoney LaRue, and features on his album Live at Billy Bob's Texas. His song "Down in Flames," co-written by Stoney LaRue, appeared on The Red Dirt Album.

One of Jenkins' notable songs, "Refinery Blues," was a biographical ballad about growing up near the Sand Springs Line, an area where oil refineries about the Arkansas River tributary of the Mississippi River. The song describes the devastating effect the refineries and their pollutants had on generations of families in the area.

In addition to writing hits for several of his fellow "brothers of the dirt," Jenkins had songs at the top of the Texas Music Radio Charts.

== Influences ==
Jenkins cited the influence of the "Tulsa Sound" of J. J. Cale and Leon Russell on his songs and said that the songwriting gives him the most satisfaction.

Jenkins also cited the life and music of Woody Guthrie as being an important part of his approach to music and focusing on people and their lives in the Oklahoma region.

== Personal life ==
Jenkins went by the nickname of Red Dirt Legend. He was married to Michele Angelique Jenkins until his death in 2018.

Jenkins was a supporter of the Red Dirt Relief Fund, a non-profit organization that supports musicians from the Red Dirt family of artists who face financial hardship.

On February 21, 2018, Jenkins was hospitalized in Nashville and underwent surgery to replace his aorta and aortic valve. After the procedure, he experienced surgical complications and remained hospitalized until his death on March 2, 2018, at the age of 48.

== Discography ==
=== Albums ===
Title	Album details	Reference
Faded	Release date: April 13, 1996; Label: Red Dirt Legend Recordings	
The Ghost of Jesse James	Release date: August 8, 1999; Label: Red Dirt Legend Recordings	
Live at the Blue Door	Release date: 2000; Label: Red Dirt Legend Recordings	
Unmended	Release date: 2002; Label: Red Dirt Legend Recordings	
Down in Flames	Release date: April 5, 2005; Label: Thirty Tigers	
VII	Release date: 2006; Label: Smith Entertainment	
Faster Than A Stone	Release date: 2008; Label: Smith Entertainment	
Tough Times Don't Last	Release date: July 2008 (originally released in February 1994); Label: Smith Entertainment	
Brothers of the Dirt	Release date: 2009; Label: E1 Music	
Under The Sun	Release date: 2011; Label: Smith Entertainment	
I Stand Alone	Release date: May 2014; Label: Red River Entertainment	
Blue Bandana	Release date: February 16, 2015; Label: Red Dirt Legend Recordings	
Brandon Jenkins @ Radio Recorders	Release date: June 22, 2015; Label: Explosive Records	
Glass House Sessions	Release date: August 12, 2015; Label: Red Dirt Legend Recordings	
The Flag	Release date: April 5, 2016; Label: Red Dirt Legend Recordings	
Tail Lights in a Boomtown	Release date: February 8, 2018; Label: Red Dirt Legend Recordings	

=== Contributions ===
- 2003: Various Artists, A Country West of Nashville (Little Dog) – "My Feet Don't Touch the Ground"
- 2006: Various Artists, Red Dirt Sampler: Volume II. Songs in the Spirit of Woody Guthrie (CD Baby) – "Refinery Blues," also Producer
- 2006: Route 66: Songs of the Mother Road (CD Baby) – "Headin' Down That Mother Road"
