= Michael DelGiorno =

American talk radio host

- Born: August 30, 1964 (age 61); Flint, Michigan, U.S.
- Education: Louisiana State University 1982-85
- Occupations: radio personality talk show host political commentator author
- Employer(s): WLAC, iHeartMedia
- Known for: Commentary on current events and social issues
- Spouse: Andrea Tiana Klahr
- Children: 3
- Family: Bob DelGiorno (father)

Michael Howard DelGiorno (born August 30, 1964) is an American talk radio host with a radio career spanning over 40 years. Delgiorno hosts the morning drive time show on 1510 WLAC in Nashville, owned by iHeartMedia, Inc. His program is syndicated to other iHeart conservative talk stations including KEX in Portland, KTOK in Oklahoma City and KAKC in Tulsa; Premiere Networks handles syndication of his program.

== Early life ==
DelGiorno was born on August 30, 1964, in Flint, Michigan. His father, Bob DelGiorno, worked as a radio personality for over 50 years. DelGiorno attended Louisiana State University 1982-85, where he was involved in Campus Crusade for Christ (Cru).

== Career ==
=== WLAC Nashville, 1850 Mainstreet Podcast, and Syndication (Present) ===
In June 2023, Michael DelGiorno began co-hosting the podcast '1850 Main Street' with fellow conservative David Zanotti. This podcast addresses various topical issues from a conservative viewpoint.

DelGiorno's inaugural broadcast on WLAC in Nashville, Tennessee, occurred on November 6, 2023, where he hosts a morning show from 5:00 AM to 8:00 AM. Following its launch, the show has rapidly expanded, achieving syndication by iHeartMedia across the United States. According to a post by Michael DelGiorno on X (formerly known as Twitter) dated April 19, 2024, the program is now aired on 22 stations. On September 24, 2024, iHeart announced that DelGiorno's program would be made available on its national conservative talk network to non-iHeart-owned stations like KIVA (AM) in Albuquerque through its syndication and network arm Premiere Networks; the rollout fills a longstanding hole in Premiere's news-talk lineup, which had left the slot open for local shows.

| Station | Location |
|---|---|
| WLAC | Nashville, TN |
| KIVA | Albuquerque, NM |
| KAKC | Tulsa, OK |
| KTOK | Oklahoma City, OK |
| WJDX | Jackson, MS |
| WHDZ | Tampa, FL |
| WREC | Memphis, TN |
| WKMQ | Tupelo, MS |
| WKBN | Youngstown, OH |
| WHLO | Akron, OH |
| WDAK | Columbus, GA |
| KSTE | Sacramento, CA |
| KTLK | St. Louis, MO |
| WILM | Wilmington, DE |
| WDOV | Dover, DE |
| WJDY | Salisbury, MD |
| WGST | Macon, GA |
| KFYI | Phoenix, AZ |
| KENI | Anchorage, AK |
| WMZQ | Washington, DC |
| KEX | Portland, OR |
| KPTR | Seattle, WA |
| WBUV | Biloxi, MS |

=== 99.7 WWTN, Nashville (2007–2023) ===
Before joining WLAC, DelGiorno was on 99.7 WWTN in Nashville, Tennessee, from 2007 to March 2023. DelGiorno left WWTN for unspecified reasons. His final broadcast on the station was on Friday, March 17, 2023.

=== KFAQ, Tulsa (2002–2007) ===
Before his tenure at WWTN, DelGiorno hosted a talk radio program on KFAQ in Tulsa, Oklahoma, from 2002 to April 2007. In 2002 he helped to establish KFAQ as a talk radio station, switching from its previous format as a country music station known as KVOO. His co-host Gwen Freeman succeeded him after his departure, but shortly afterward (February 2008), also left KFAQ, initially joining him as co-host of his Nashville program.

=== KTBZ "The BUZZ" AM 1430, Tulsa ===
DelGiorno served as the Operations Manager of Clear Channel Radio Tulsa and hosted the morning show on KTBZ "The BUZZ" AM 1430.

=== KRMG, Tulsa ===
In 1991, DelGiorno was named operations manager and program director of NewsTalk 740 KRMG. At KRMG, he was twice voted "Oklahoma Radio Personality of the Year" by the Oklahoma Association of Broadcasters.

=== WNTR Network ===
Prior to working at KRMG, DelGiorno worked as vice president for programming at the WNTR network. The WNTR network was owned by Pat Robertson’s company, Broadcast Equities, Inc.

== Personal life ==
Michael DelGiorno is a Christian. He lives in Franklin, Tennessee with his wife Andrea Klahr DelGiorno. They have twin daughters and a son. With his family from Upstate New York, DelGiorno grew up a Syracuse Orange fan.

== Memoir ==
In 2004, DelGiorno published a memoir where he shared insights into his radio career, political and religious beliefs, and personal experiences, including his struggle with being born with a clubfoot and facing personal bankruptcy.

- DelGiorno, Michael (January 1, 2004). Standing Up for What's Right: The Only Thing Left Shocking in Life Is the Truth!. Dallas, Texas: Brown Books. ISBN 978-0975578407.

== Controversies ==
DelGiorno saw controversy while in Tulsa, Oklahoma. An outspoken critic of gambling and Indian casinos, DelGiorno was banned from two separate Indian casinos based upon allegations of inappropriate conduct. DelGiorno admitted on the air that he had been gambling but never admitted to the allegations of misconduct.

Additionally, DelGiorno was sued for defamation by Tulsa City Councilor Bill Christiansen over remarks made on the air about Christiansen's business practices. The suit was settled before trial. Terms of the settlement were confidential, but DelGiorno's former radio station, KFAQ, was required to run a retraction and apologize for DelGiorno's remarks, which the station admitted were not true.

In 2016, DelGiorno played a role in a controversy involving Williamson County School Board member Susan Curlee. The controversy stemmed from Curlee's alleged mishandling of information related to a bullying incident concerning a minor student, identified as John Doe. DelGiorno discussed this incident on his radio show after receiving and then reading a leaked email from the superintendent, which was meant to remain confidential. This action potentially compromised the board's legal position and raised concerns about privacy violations. Curlee resigned in August 2016.

His radio show has been noted to regularly feature anti-Muslim activist Cathy Hinners.
