= KAKC =

Radio station in Tulsa, Oklahoma

Coordinates: 35°59′40″N 95°51′27″W

- Tulsa, Oklahoma; United States
- Broadcast area: Tulsa metropolitan area
- Frequency: 1300 kHz
- Branding: 93.5/1300 The Patriot

Programming
- Format: Conservative talk
- Network: Fox News Radio
- Affiliations: Premiere Networks; Compass Media Networks

Ownership
- Owner: iHeartMedia; (iHM Licenses, LLC)
- Sister stations: KIZS; KMOD-FM; KTBT; KTBZ; KTGX

History
- First air date: December 25, 1938 (as KOME on 1310)
- Former call signs: KOME (1938–1969); KCNW (1969–1976); KXXO (1976–1980); KMOD (1980–1982); KBBJ (1982–1987)
- Former frequencies: 1340 kHz (1938–1950)

Technical information
- Licensing authority: FCC
- Facility ID: 11939
- Class: B
- Power: 5,000 watts days; 1,000 watts nights
- Translator: KTGX-HD2: 93.5 K228BR (Tulsa)
- Repeater: (106.1-2) KTGX-HD2 (Tulsa)

Links
- Public license information: Public file; LMS
- Webcast: Listen live
- Website: 1300thepatriot.iheart.com

KAKC (1300 kHz) is a commercial AM radio station in Tulsa, Oklahoma, United States. The station airs a conservative talk radio format and is owned by iHeartMedia The studios are on South Yale Avenue at the Tulsa Event Center in Southeast Tulsa.

By day, KAKC transmits 5,000 watts. To protect other stations on 1300 kHz from interference, at night it reduces power to 1,000 watts. It uses a directional antenna with a three-tower array. The transmitter site is off South 109th Avenue East in Bixby. Programming is also heard on 250-watt FM translator K228BR at 93.5 MHz in Tulsa.

== History ==
This radio station has changed owners, programming formats, and call signs many times as the industry consolidated media ownership into the hands of a smaller number of companies who owned stations nationwide.

The current KAKC is not the same as the KAKC in Tulsa from the 1950s through 1980. At that time, the KAKC call sign was used by 970 AM (now KCFO), a station founded by Sam Avey, a wrestling promotor and owner of the Tulsa Oilers and broadcast from the Tulsa Coliseum until it was destroyed in the 1952 fire.

=== KOME, Oil Capital Sales (1938–1951) ===
The station signed on the air in 1938, broadcasting at 1310 kHz with 250 watts power. It was a network affiliate of the Mutual Broadcasting System. Their slogan, playing on the KOME call sign, was "Kovers Oklahoma's Magic Empire", creating a backronym by misspelling "covers" as "kovers". Tulsa was known as the "Magic Empire" originally because the Tulsa Daily World's circulation department referred to their circulation area with this phrase.

The station was started by Harry Schwartz, who also was the president of the Tulsa Federation of Labor, and a business manager for the union's monthly paper, the Unionist Journal. Schwartz created the Oil Capital Sales Corporation business name to run the station and he owned 98% of its stock; in addition to being called the "Magic Empire," Tulsa also was often called the "Oil Capital".

The first KOME broadcast was on Christmas Day and included 'special programs from New York City, Chicago, and Oklahoma City and featured Bob Wills and his Texas Playboys, Governor E.W. Marland, Jimmie Wilson and his Catfish String Band, and the Pioneer Mother's Chorus.' At first, the station's license only allowed daytime broadcasts, but they received special permission to air in the evenings for New Year's celebrations, President Franklin D. Roosevelt's 1939 President's Birthday Ball to fight infantile paralysis, the Golden Gloves amateur boxing tournament, the American Legion birthday party, and the opening week of the 1939 Major League Baseball season.

In 1939, the license was modified to allow unlimited broadcasts, not just daytime, with 250 watts. In 1941, with the 1941 enactment of North American Regional Broadcasting Agreement (NARBA), KOME moved to 1340 kHz. In 1947, the frequency changed to 1300 kHz.

Note that in 1939, their stated policy was "no liquor advertising", and that was not uncommon: A 1939 annual listing of radio stations had 110 stations limiting or refusing alcohol-related advertisements. This would be a controversial issue with the next station owner.

=== KOME, John Brown University (1951–1957) ===
In 1951, John Brown University bought the station from Oil Capital Sales for $200,000 (equivalent to about $2,387,000 in 2024). John Elward Brown, the school's founder, bought the station as part of an effort to create an endowment for his school. At the time of purchase, the university was already running two other radio stations: KUOA in Siloam Springs, Arkansas was a student-run station on the university campus, and KGER in Long Beach, California was part of the endowment effort.

The station and its new owner entered into controversy with an early decision: they would not air advertisements for beer or other alcoholic beverages. Part of this was because Brown was a Methodist and evangelist, part of it was because the university was a Christian one where alcohol was also forbidden, and part of it was because they were marketing their three radio stations as wholesome "stations of the American home". Also, Oklahoma was still "dry". When federal Prohibition ended in 1933, Oklahoma did not end it in their state. Instead, they passed the Oklahoma Beer Act of 1933 and only allowed sales of "near beer" (3.2% ABW beer). Regular beer, wine, and liquor were illegal to sale in stores, bars, restaurants, and other establishments. This was true until Oklahoma passed the Liquor Control Act of 1959.

KOME was still affiliated with Mutual Broadcasting System, and the station relayed their programming which included Falstaff beer ads during baseball game broadcasts. As a result, Mutual ended the affiliation. Some other stations followed KOME's lead, and the decision entered into public debate along with the wider issue of continued Prohibition in Oklahoma.

Brown died in February 1957, and in September of that year John Brown University sold KOME.

=== KOME, Kluge and Austad (1957–1958) ===
In 1957, John Kluge and Mark Evans Austad bought the station from John Brown University for $100,000 (equivalent to about $1,111,400 in 2024).

During the short period of this new ownership, KOME attracted attention with various stunts. For example, the station sent homing pigeons to advertising executives asking for orders. They hired a helicopter to drop toy dogs around Tulsa for a listener contest. Rocky Frisco road his bicycle 500 miles to interview Elvis Presley and get his autograph on the bicycle, which they gave to a listener.

Kluge and Austad sold KOME and three other stations they'd bought earlier (KXLW St. Louis, WINE Buffalo, WEEP Pittsburgh) when they bought Metromedia.

=== KOME, Charles Holt (1958–1960) ===
In 1958, Charles W. Holt and his associates bought the station from Kluge and Austad for more than $250,000 (equivalent to about $2,700,000 in 2024). Holt owned several radio stations, primarily in the South; when he bought KOME, he also owned WHSY Hattiesburg, WHNY McComb, WHXY Bogalusa, and WHHY Montgomery.

In 1959, KOME became an affiliate of the ABC Radio Network to air hourly 5-minute segments of global news.

=== KOME, Franklin Broadcasting Co. (1960–1964) ===
In 1960, Franklin Broadcasting bought the station from Charlie Holt for $315,000 (equivalent to about $3,324,000 in 2024), which included paying Holt $15,000 consultant fee for three years. Franklin Broadcasting was publicly traded company owned primarily by William F. (Bill) Johns Jr., and they controlled many other stations including at this time WMIN St. Paul, WLOD Pompano Beach, and KRIB Mason City, WYFE New Orleans.

In 1962, Franklin Broadcasting merged with Radio Concepts Inc. of New York, which created and sold radio advertising and promotional items. Although Radio Concepts worked as a division of Franklin Broadcasting, by 1963, Franklin Broadcasting was trying to sell all their radio stations. They tried to sell KOME to Producers, Inc. (wholly owned by Polaris Corporation) for the same amount they paid for it in 1960, but the deal did not go through. They finally sell it to Wagenvoord Broadcasting.

=== KOME, Wagenvoord Broadcasting (1964–1968) ===
In 1964, Wagenvoord Broadcasting Company bought KOME from Franklin Broadcasting. David Wagenvoord worked for Franklin Broadcasting before this purchase, as executive vice-president of radio operations for all their stations, and as general manager of WWOM New Orleans and vice-president of their New Orleans branch office before that.

Around this same time, Wagenvoord also was buying other Franklin Broadcasting stations such as WWOM New Orleans, and buying KVIM New Iberia with attorney Fred P. Westenberger, with a company portmanteau of their names: Wagenwest Inc. Within two years, KOME was reportedly owned by Wagenwest.

=== KCNW, Tracy-Locke, Inc. (1968–1973) ===
In 1968, Tracy-Locke bought KOME from Wagenvoord. Tracy-Locke is a Dallas-based advertising agency, and Morris L. Hite was the company president. Tracy-Locke created two subsidiary companies, each of which bought a radio station:

- Unicom bought KOME in 1968 and changed its call sign to KCNW in 1969.
- Broadcasting Consultants Corp. bought KJIM in Fort Worth.

At the time, it was against American Association of Advertising Agencies (4As)'s rules for their members (ad agencies) to buy media companies, but when two other advertising agencies also bought media companies and all three left 4As to do so, 4As changed their rule to allow it. In 1971, Hite bought out the controlling stock from Tracy-Locke.

KCNW was the first station in Tulsa to try programming with Countrypolitan music.

=== KXXO, San Antonio Broadcasting, Inc. (1973–1979) ===
In 1973, KCNW was failing financially and another Tulsa-based station owned by Tracy-Locke (KMOD-FM) had been off the air for a year and was in bankruptcy. Investment banker Lowry Mays and auto magnate Red McCombs had recently formed the San Antonio Broadcasting company, and bought another failing radio station (KEEZ (FM) in Texas. They bought the two Tulsa stations for relatively little money—KCNW for $665,000 (equivalent to about $4,700,000 in 2024) and KMOD for $85,000 (equivalent to about $613,500 in 2024).

They changed KCNW's call sign to KXXO. It became a news/talk station, with bad ratings made worse by its poor signal. Meanwhile, KMOD returned on the air as an album rock station, and had good ratings but not many advertisers. They decided to simulcast KMOD-FM's album rock programs on KXXO's AM frequency, which lowered costs for running KXXO while attracting more listeners. Sales staff promoted to advertisers that their album-rock listeners were less "hip" and more "family-oriented", which was advertisers' target audience.

=== KMOD (AM), Clear Channel Communications (1979–1982) ===
In June 1973, Mays and his partners also bought WOAI (AM) in San Antonio, a clear-channel station. They did this with a new company named Clear Channel Communications. For a while, this new company would operate separately from San Antonio Broadcasting. However, in 1979, they would merge the two companies, transfer KXXO's license to Clear Channel Communications, and in 1980 change the call sign from KXXO to KMOD.

The programming changed to Music of Your Life.

=== KBBJ, Clear Channel Communications (1982–1987) ===
In 1982, the format and call sign changed again. KMOD became KBBJ, and the format changed to big band and jazz.

=== KAKC, iHeartMedia (1987–present) ===
In 1987, the station's call sign changed again, from KBBJ to KAKC, which ironically was the same call sign used by their former rival (now KCFO) in 1957. The format was oldies, including a morning show with popular DJs John Henry and Spencer Rhodes that featured Country and Western, Swing and early rock and roll. They featured many artists from the 1930s and the 1940s. Two of the core artists were Hank Williams and Bob Wills. The program often broadcast from the Cain's Ballroom in Tulsa. The show concentrated on the early years of Rock and Roll and had many of the original artists in studio who gave interviews and spoke of their own upbringings. These artists included The Shirelles, Chubby Checker, Chuck Berry, Hank Williams' backup musicians and driver of their tour bus, Roy Orbison, Bo Diddley who in an interview with Spencer Rhodes spoke of his days picking cotton as a child. There were other artists from the 1940s and 1950s who played the state fair circuits later in life and visited Tulsa. They stopped by the studio and gave interviews to John Henry and Spencer Rhodes' early morning Country Swing and Rock and Roll show known as the "Hillbilly Hit Parade."

In 1990, the station changed formats again, from oldies to CNN headline News. The popular morning show ended, although John Henry moved to an afternoon slot and a simulcast blues show with KMOD-FM also continued. The next year, Henry's timeslot was moved to afternoons.

In 2007, KAKC changed its format to sports, with programming from ESPN Radio.

In 2008, Bain Capital and Thomas H. Lee Partners bought Clear Channel Communications for $26.7 billion in a leveraged buyout and took the company private. By that time, Clear Channel owned about 850 radio stations plus other media outlets.

In 2014, Clear Channel changed their name to iHeartMedia, and in 2018 they filed for Chapter 11 bankruptcy to restructure its $20 billion debt that it still owed from the money borrowed during the leveraged buyout. In 2019, iHeartMedia returned as a publicly traded company.

Meanwhile, during this period of restructuring, the station changed programming formats again. In 2015, KAKC became the local network affiliate of CBS Sports Radio. It was the Tulsa radio home for the Oklahoma City Thunder, the Tulsa Roughnecks FC and the Cleveland Browns Radio Network.

In 2021, KAKC changed its format from sports to conservative talk, branded as "1300 The Patriot". It began carrying many of the hosts from co-owned Premiere Networks, as well as shows from Westwood One and the Salem Radio Network.

On September 9, 2024, KAKC began simulcasting on KTGX-HD2 and translator K228BR 93.5 FM Tulsa.

== Programming ==
Much of the KAKC schedule is nationally syndicated talk shows. Weekdays begin with This Morning, America's First News with Gordon Deal followed by Your Morning Show with Michael DelGiorno, The Glenn Beck Radio Program, The Clay Travis and Buck Sexton Show, Armstrong & Getty, The Jesse Kelly Show, The Michael Berry Show, Our American Stories with Lee Habeeb and Coast to Coast AM with George Noory. While KAKC carries most of the syndicated conservative talk shows available from co-owned Premiere Networks, it doesn't air The Sean Hannity Show. That program is heard on rival talk stations 740 KRMG and 102.3 KRMG-FM.

On weekends, syndicated shows include The Weekend with Michael Brown, At Home with Gary Sullivan, Rich DeMuro on Tech, Somewhere in Time with Art Bell, Tom Gresham's Gun Talk, The Ben Ferguson Show and Sunday Nights with Bill Cunningham. Most hours begin with an update from Fox News Radio.
