= WAKB =

Coordinates: 33.378°N 82.077°W

- Hephzibah, Georgia; United States
- Broadcast area: Augusta metropolitan area
- Frequency: 100.9 MHz
- Branding: Magic 100.9

Programming
- Format: Urban adult contemporary

Ownership
- Owner: Perry Publishing and Broadcasting; (Perry Broadcasting of Augusta, Inc.)
- Sister stations: WAEG, WFXA-FM, WTHB

History
- First air date: June 10, 1979 (46 years ago) as 96.7 WRNZ Wrens
- Former call signs: WYFA (1985–1993); WAGW (1993–1994); WAEJ (1994–2002); WTHB-FM (2002–2007)

Technical information
- Licensing authority: FCC
- Facility ID: 31942
- Class: C3
- ERP: 16,000 watts
- HAAT: 92 meters (302 ft)

Links
- Public license information: Public file; LMS
- Webcast: Listen Live
- Website: 1009magic.com

WAKB (100.9 FM) is a commercial radio station licensed to Hephzibah, Georgia, and serving the Augusta metropolitan area. It is owned by Perry Publishing and Broadcasting and broadcasts an urban adult contemporary radio format. The radio studios and offices are on Broadcast Drive at Radio Station Road in North Augusta, South Carolina. WAKB carries the syndicated "Rickey Smiley Morning Show" from Dallas.

WAKB has an effective radiated power (ERP) of 16,000 watts. The transmitter tower is located on Tobacco Road near Windsor Spring Road in Augusta.

== History ==
On June 10, 1979, the station first signed on as WRNZ in Wrens, Georgia. It was a Top 40 outlet known as "Z96," using the frequency 96.7 MHz. The station moved up the dial to 96.9 and became WMJB in 1984 and WRDW-FM in 1985.

In 1991, the station switched its call sign to WAKB. At first, it broadcast the Satellite Music Network (SMN) urban adult contemporary format known as "The Touch." Eventually it went with local disc jockeys in the late 1990s under the "Magic 96.9" name.

WAKB was sold by Radio One in the mid-2000s to Perry Broadcasting as Radio One decided to focus on larger markets. On Jan. 11, 2008 at 2:58 p.m., WAKB swapped frequencies with 100.9 WTHB, which had been urban gospel. This happened 2 minutes before Doug Banks launch his afternoon show The Ride with Doug and DeDe began. The station then became Magic 100.9.

In 2009, WAKB increased its power from 6,000 to 25,000 watts and moved its tower closer to Augusta. It switched its city of license to Hephzibah, Georgia, a community just outside Augusta. On December 30, 2009, WAKB dropped the Doug Banks Show (which later returned, airing evenings 7-11pm) and played music in the 3-7 pm time slot. In February 2010, former WLXC/Columbia midday host Tre' Taylor joined WAKB and began hosting afternoons. A year later Tre' Taylor left WAKB, returning Doug Banks to afternoons. In 2019 the syndicated “ Chubb Rock afternoons with Siman Baby” Show was put in the 3-7 pm time slot. In January 2020, When The Tom Joyner Morning Show went off the air for good, the syndicated The Rickey Smiley Morning Show was brought over from sister station WFXA-FM.

== See also ==
- Media in Augusta, Georgia
