= KQIS =

KQIS may refer to:

- KQIS (AM), a radio station (1340 AM) licensed to serve Bethel Heights, Arkansas, United States
- KYBG, a radio station (102.1 FM) licensed to serve Basile, Louisiana, United States, which held the call sign KQIS from 1997 to 2010
