= WFXA-FM =

Radio station in Augusta, Georgia, U.S.

Coordinates: 33.500°N 81.934°W

- Augusta, Georgia; United States
- Broadcast area: Augusta metropolitan area
- Frequency: 103.1 MHz
- Branding: Foxie 103 Jamz

Programming
- Format: Mainstream urban

Ownership
- Owner: Perry Publishing and Broadcasting; (Perry Broadcasting of Augusta, Inc.)
- Sister stations: WAKB, WTHB, WAEG

History
- First air date: 1968 (as WZZW)
- Former call signs: WZZW (1968–1985)
- Call sign meaning: We're FoXie Augusta

Technical information
- Licensing authority: FCC
- Facility ID: 15848
- Class: A
- ERP: 6,000 watts
- HAAT: 92 meters

Links
- Public license information: Public file; LMS
- Webcast: Listen Live
- Website: foxie103jamz.com

WFXA-FM (103.1 MHz) is a mainstream urban radio station in Augusta, Georgia known as Foxie 103 Jamz. The station is owned by Perry Publishing and Broadcasting. The station's studios (which are shared with its other sister stations) and transmitter are co-located at the aptly named intersection of Broadcast Drive and Radio Station Road in North Augusta, South Carolina.

== History ==
The station signed on in 1968 as WZZW with an automated beautiful music format. It was one of the first stations in the Augusta market to broadcast in full stereo. By 1980, WZZW shifted towards a mainstream adult contemporary station, while still remaining fully automated. The station started airing The Rick Dees Weekly Top 40 Countdown when it debuted in September 1983. By 1984, that show would move to crosstown, then top 40 station WBBQ.

On February 1, 1985, WZZW flipped to urban contemporary as WFXA. In 2001, the station was purchased by Radio One.

WFXA was formerly home to the syndicated Doug Banks Morning Show and was the only Radio One station to carry the show. When former owner Radio One sold their Augusta cluster to Oklahoma City-based Perry Broadcasting in August 2007, Doug Banks was dropped for The Rickey Smiley Morning Show.

On January 11, 2008 at 2:58 pm WFXA relaunched itself, changing its branding from Foxie 103.1 Jamz, "The People's Station" to 103 Jamz The Fox, The Hip-Hop & R&B Leader".

Around the end of 2009, WFXA once again started identifying as Foxie 103 Jamz. Its direct competition is WPRW and WIIZ. In January 2020, when The Rickey Smiley Morning Show was sent to sister station WAKB when The Tom Joyner Morning Show went off the air for good, It was replaced by the new syndicated urban morning show The Morning Hustle.

== See also ==
- Media in Augusta, Georgia
