= KWCO-FM =

- Chickasha, Oklahoma; United States
- Frequency: 105.5 MHz (HD Radio)
- Branding: KOOL 105.5 fm

Programming
- Format: Classic hits
- Subchannels: HD2: Country "106.1 The Ranch"
- Affiliations: Radio Oklahoma Network

Ownership
- Owner: Hilliary Broadcasting Co Inc.
- Sister stations: KACO, KJMZ, KKEN, KXCA, KFTP, KKRX

History
- First air date: 1966

Technical information
- Licensing authority: FCC
- Facility ID: 6750
- Class: A
- ERP: 3,300 watts
- HAAT: 135 meters (443 ft)
- Transmitter coordinates: 35°0′38.00″N 97°55′54.00″W
- Translator: HD2: 106.1 K291BR (Chickasha)

Links
- Public license information: Public file; LMS
- Webcast: Listen Live; Listen Live (HD2)
- Website: kool1055fm.com 1061theranch.com (HD2)

KWCO-FM (105.5 MHz, "KOOL 105.5 fm") is a radio station broadcasting a classic hits music format. Licensed to Chickasha, Oklahoma, United States, the station is currently owned by Hilliary Broadcasting Co Inc. Most of KWCO-FM's programming is live and local Monday–Friday 6 AM – 6 PM, and during local sports broadcast coverage. KWCO offers a local swap-shop program.

== History ==
The callsign KWCO can be traced back to the original AM 1560 KWCO radio from the 1940s. In the '20s, KOCW was owned by the Oklahoma College for Women (on 1190 then). Due to costs necessary to upgrade the station to newer technical standards set forth by the Federal Radio Commission at the time (in the 1930s), the original KOCW was sold to Griffin. To the surprise of the college, the station was then moved promptly to the Tulsa market, leaving Chickasha without their radio station. So in the '40s when a new station came online, KWCO was picked as the call sign because it was the reverse of KOCW. KWCO was as close to the original call as was available at the time.

In the mid-'40s the transmitter site was located at U.S. Highway 81 and Grand Avenue. The studio was in the Briscoe Building at 427 W. Chickasha Ave in 1946. Later, around 1950, the studio was moved out to the tower on Grand and 81. Later, in the 1975, the studio and transmitter site was moved to 500 W. Country Club Rd.

KWCO 1560 AM of Chickasha in the 2000s was moved out of Chickasha by Tyler to "Del City" (towers on 15th and I-35) leaving Chickasha without their AM again. KWCO's FM station on 105.5 was left in the market with the legacy of KWCO as KWCO-FM due to co-ownership for a period of time.

The current KWCO-FM broadcasts from a former gas station from the '20s in downtown Chickasha at 7th Street and Chickasha Avenue as Chickasha's only commercially licensed radio station. Some of the former calls for KWCO-FM were KTUZ and also KXXK. The original call sign for 105.5 was KNDR, established by Ben DeKinder (a former employee of KWCO (AM) in 1966.

KOOL 105.5 has been in the Classic Hits format since 2002, longer than any other station in the state. It was one of the first to adopt this format in the US.

In the spring of 2013 KWCO-FM began broadcasting in IBOC (HD Radio). 105.5HD2 is 106.1 The Ranch www.1061TheRanch.com, playing a mix of new and old country, and can also be heard on translator K291BR on 106.1 FM. http://transition.fcc.gov/fcc-bin/fmq?list=0&facid=157206

In December 2025, Hilliary Broadcasting Co. Inc. purchased KWCO and closed on the sale on June 10, 2026.

== Translator ==
Broadcast translator for KWCO-HD2
Call sign	Frequency	City of license	FID	ERP (W)	HAAT	Class	FCC info
K291BR	106.1 FM	Chickasha, Oklahoma	157206	250	130.5 m (428 ft)	D	LMS

== Office location ==
KWCO-FM's office location is 627 W Chickasha Avenue in Chickasha.
