= KBRS (disambiguation) =

KBRS may refer to:

== Callsigns ==
- KBRS-FM 109.6 MHz (since 2013), Belle Rose, Louisiana, USA; a radio station; simulcasting KKAY-AM 1590 kHz of White Castle, LA, USA
- KBRS-FM 104.9 MHz (1994-2000), Springdale, Arkansas, USA; former callsign of KXNA-FM 104.9 MHz
- KBRS-AM 1340 kHz (1949-1992), Springdale, Arkansas, USA; former radio station now replaced by KQIS (AM) 1340 kHz

== Other uses ==
- Knorr-Bremse Rail Services (KBRS), British division of Knorr-Bremse
- Hispano-Suiza Kbrs, one of the Hispano-Suiza piston aero-engines
- KBRS (Indonesian: kapal bantu rumah sakit, lit. 'hospital ship'), Indonesian hospital ships

== See also ==
- KBR (disambiguation)
