= KWEN =

Radio station in Tulsa, Oklahoma

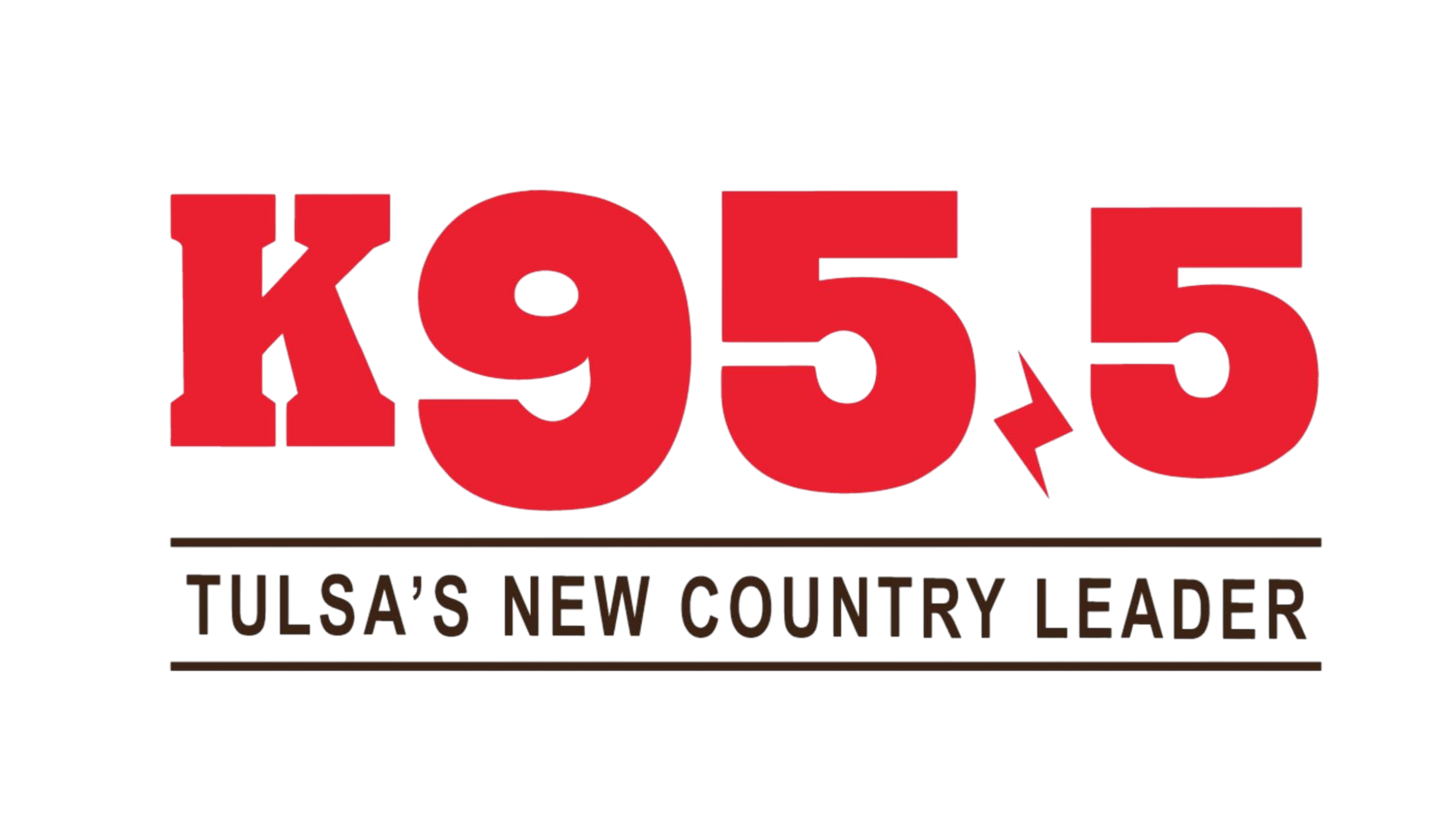
- Tulsa, Oklahoma; United States
- Broadcast area: Tulsa metropolitan area
- Frequency: 95.5 MHz (HD Radio)
- Branding: K95.5

Programming
- Language: English
- Format: Country
- Subchannels: HD2: Oldies "Groovy 105.7"

Ownership
- Owner: Zoellner Media Group LLC
- Sister stations: KRHZ; KRAV-FM; KRMG; KRMG-FM

History
- First air date: 1961 (as KRMG-FM)
- Former call signs: KRMG-FM (1961–1973)
- Call sign meaning: "Queen" (previous beautiful music format)

Technical information
- Licensing authority: FCC
- Facility ID: 48722
- Class: C
- ERP: 100,000 watts
- HAAT: 453 meters (1,486 ft)
- Transmitter coordinates: 36°11′46″N 96°05′53″W
- Translator: HD2: 105.7 K289CC (Tulsa)

Links
- Public license information: Public file; LMS
- Webcast: Listen live Listen live (HD2)
- Website: www.k95tulsa.com groovy1057.com (HD2)

KWEN (95.5 FM) is a commercial radio station in Tulsa, Oklahoma, United States. The station is owned by Zoellner Media Group LLC and airs a country music radio format. The studios and offices are on Memorial Drive in Tulsa. The transmitter is on Route 97 in Sand Springs.

== History ==
In 1961, the station first signed on as KRMG-FM, the FM counterpart of KRMG, owned by Swanco Broadcasting, and simulcasting the AM station's programming. At first, it broadcast at only 2,950 watts. A few years later, KRMG-FM began airing a beautiful music format, and in the mid-1970s, changed its call sign to KWEN.

Swanco also owned the similarly-formatted KKNG in Oklahoma City. The two FM sister stations were branded as the "King and Queen of Oklahoma," as the KWEN call letters were meant to suggest "Queen", while KKNG was "King." In the mid-1970s, KWEN's effective radiated power was boosted to 100,000 watts, though the tower was still only 300 feet in height above average terrain.

In 1977, the station was sold to Curtis Communications. In August 1978, the station changed formats to Top 40, and quickly came to dominate the market. In 1981, KWEN changed hands again, this time going to Katz Broadcasting. Katz flipped the station to country music. That put it in competition with KTFX (now co-owned classic rock KJSR) and AM country leader 1170 KVOO. As country music listening shifted from AM to FM, KWEN became Tulsa's top country outlet, forcing KVOO to switch to the FM dial at 98.5 FM.

In 1986, Katz Broadcasting was acquired by Newcity Communications. The following year, Newcity acquired KRMG, putting the two stations back under common ownership. It was also during the 1980s that KWEN got a boost in its antenna height, broadcasting from a tower more than 1,300 feet tall, with a signal stretching from the border of Kansas to the suburbs of Oklahoma City.

In 1997, Atlanta-based Cox Media acquired KWEN and KRMG. Cox eventually added three other FM stations and two TV stations to its Tulsa roster.

On May 19, 2025, Dr. Robert Zoellner's Zoellner Media Group entered in an agreement with Cox Media Group to acquire the company's radio cluster in Tulsa for $20 million. The sale was completed on August 15, 2025.

== HD Radio ==
KWEN broadcasts in the HD Radio digital format.

KWEN aired a Contemporary Christian music format on its HD2 subchannel, branded as "Spirit 105.7", which was also simulcast on FM translator K289CC (105.7 MHz). On January 19, 2018, KWEN-HD2 changed the format to active rock, branded as "105.7 The Bone".

On December 11, 2020, K289CC switched from active rock to business news, branded as "Success 105.7", and began simulcasting KWEN-HD4. The HD3 and HD4 subchannels have since been de-activated, resulting in the business news format moving to HD2.

On March 16, 2023 radio news outlet RadioInsight reported that Screen Door Broadcasting had quietly flipped K289CC/95.5-HD2 to Oldies as “Groovy 105.7” earlier in the month. The new station is focused on music from the 1960s and 1970s, bringing the format back to the Tulsa market for the first time since iHeartMedia had flipped K228BR to Classic Rock in 2018.

== Translators ==
Broadcast translator for KWEN-HD2
Call sign	Frequency	City of license	FID	ERP (W)	HAAT	Class	FCC info
K289CC	105.7 FM	Tulsa, Oklahoma	153264	250	155 m (509 ft)	D	LMS
