= KRAV-FM =

Radio station in Sand Springs, Oklahoma

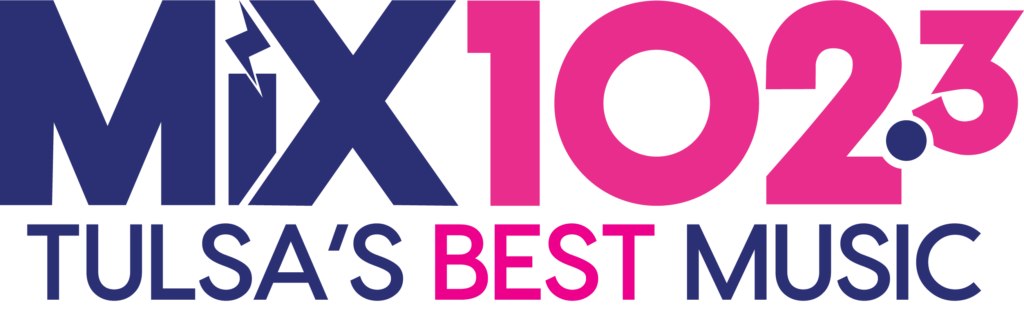
- Sand Springs, Oklahoma; United States
- Broadcast area: Tulsa metropolitan area
- Frequency: 102.3 MHz (HD Radio)
- Branding: Mix 102.3

Programming
- Language: English
- Format: Hot adult contemporary

Ownership
- Owner: Zoellner Media Group LLC
- Sister stations: KRHZ; KRMG; KRMG-FM; KWEN

History
- First air date: November 1, 1962
- Call sign meaning: Named after former owner, George KRAVis

Technical information
- Licensing authority: FCC
- Facility ID: 65764
- Class: C2
- ERP: 50,000 watts
- HAAT: 150 meters (490 ft)
- Transmitter coordinates: 36.211°N 96.101°W

Links
- Public license information: Public file; LMS
- Webcast: Listen live Listen live (via Audacy)
- Website: www.mix1023tulsa.com

KRAV-FM (102.3 MHz) is a commercial radio station licensed to Sand Springs, Oklahoma, United States, and serving the Tulsa metropolitan area. Owned by Zoellner Media Group LLC, it airs a hot adult contemporary radio format, playing a mix of pop hits from the 1990s to today. Its studios and offices are located in the Cox Broadcasting Complex on South Memorial Drive, near Interstate 44 in Tulsa. The transmitter is on Route 97 in the Osage Reservation north of Sand Springs.

== History ==
On November 1, 1962, KRAV first signed on. It was owned by the Boston Broadcasting Company, with George R. Kravis II as president and general manager. (The call sign is the first four letters of Kravis' last name.) A stand-alone FM radio station was rare in the 1960s, when there were few FM receivers; most FM stations were co-owned by AM stations, simply simulcasting the same programming.

At first, KRAV's effective radiated power was 20,000 watts from a 330-foot-tower, giving it a fraction of the coverage it has today. In 1966, Kravis bought AM station KFMJ (now KGTO), a 1,000 watt daytimer, to pair with KRAV. It aired classic country music, while KRAV continued with its easy listening/middle of the road format. In the 1970s, KRAV moved to an adult contemporary format, while KFMJ switched to a Christian radio format.

In 1976, KRAV moved from AC to a Hot AC format as FM96 KRAV, also calling itself V96 FM. In the 1990s, KRAV's power was boosted to 100,000 watts, though broadcasting from a 137-foot-tall tower.

In 1996, Kravis sold KRAV and KFMJ to Cox Radio for $5.5 million. Cox continued the Hot AC format on KRAV, while switching KFMJ to adult standards and oldies as KGTO. KRAV and KGTO moved into studios on South Yale Avenue, along with co-owned KRMG. KGTO would be sold to Perry Broadcasting several years later.

In 2009, KRAV was relocated to a much taller tower shared with Cox's other FM and TV stations, at 1,486 feet (453 meters) in height above average terrain in Sand Springs. Its signal now extends from the Kansas border to the suburbs of Oklahoma City.

On May 19, 2025, Dr. Robert Zoellner's Zoellner Media Group entered in an agreement with Cox Media Group to acquire the company's radio cluster in Tulsa for $20 million. The sale was completed on August 15, 2025.

On August 3, 2026, it was announced by Zoellner Media Group that KRAV-FM and KRMG-FM will swap frequencies, effective August 31st. This move will shift all KRAV music programming to KRMG's 50,000-watt signal on 102.3 MHz. KRMG will move its News/Talk programming to the 100,000-watt signal currently used by KRAV-FM on 96.5 MHz, improving and increasing KRMG's reach. The station was rebranded as Mix 102.3.
