= KMOD =

KMOD may refer to:

- KMOD-FM, a radio station (97.5 FM) licensed to Tulsa, Oklahoma, US
- Modesto City–County Airport (ICAO code), in Modesto, California, US
- Kernel module, in computing
