= KFMD =

KFMD may refer to:

- KDHT (FM) a radio station (95.7) licensed to Denver, Colorado, United States, which held the call signs KFMD-FM from November 2000 to May 2005
- KXVB, a radio station (101.5 FM) licensed to serve Greenland, Arkansas, United States, which held the call signs KFMD or KFMD-FM from 2012 to 2022
- KQIS (AM), a radio station (1340 AM) licensed to serve Bethel Heights, Arkansas, which held the call sign KFMD from 2012 to 2015
- KATF, a radio station in Dubuque, Iowa that held the KFMD callsign previously.
- KNNN, a radio station in Redding, California that was previously known as KFMD-LP from 2006-2010
