= Gwen Freeman =

American radio host

Gwen Freeman is an American morning talk radio show co-host. She had been a co-host on 1170 KFAQ in Tulsa, Oklahoma since the inception of The Michael DelGiorno Show in 2002. From 2002 to April, 2007, she was DelGiorno's co-host ("sidekick"). When he left for WWTN in Nashville, Tennessee, Freeman took over as the senior hostess of the renamed The Morning Show. Former Tulsa City Councilor and mayoral candidate Chris Medlock joined her as co-host at that time.

1170 KFAQ is in Tulsa, which is the 65th largest radio market. KFAQ was ranked 10th in the market for spring '07 with a rating on 3.6, badly trailing KRMG, the dominant talk radio station in the Tulsa market which has a rating of 6.2. The Morning Show on KFAQ had better ratings than the morning programming on KRMG for most of the time since its inception.

Freeman left KFAQ after an on-air dispute with Chris Medlock that occurred during a broadcast on Tuesday, February 12, 2008, at approximately 6:40 a.m. Her departure was officially announced on KFAQ on Wednesday February 20, 2008, during The Morning Show.

Freeman has re-joined The Michael DelGiorno Show in Nashville, Tennessee on WWTN.
