= KTBZ =

KTBZ may refer to:

- KTBZ (AM), a radio station (1430 AM) licensed to Tulsa, Oklahoma, United States
- KTBZ-FM, a radio station (94.5 FM) licensed to Houston, Texas, United States
