= WTHB =

Radio station in Augusta/Wrens, Georgia, United States

WTHB and WTHB-FM

WTHB: Augusta, Georgia; WTHB-FM: Wrens, Georgia
- Broadcast area: Augusta metropolitan area
- Frequencies: WTHB: 1550 kHz; WTHB-FM: 96.9 MHz
- Branding: Praise 96.9 & 1550

Programming
- Format: Urban gospel

Ownership
- Owner: Perry Publishing and Broadcasting; (Perry Broadcasting of Augusta, Inc.)
- Sister stations: WAEG, WAKB, WFXA-FM

History
- First air date: WTHB: 1960; WTHB-FM: 1979

Technical information
- Licensing authority: FCC
- Facility ID: WTHB: 15843; WTHB-FM: 15849
- Class: WTHB: D; WTHB-FM: C3
- Power: WTHB: 5,000 watts (day); 11 watts (night)
- ERP: WTHB-FM: 6,200 watts
- HAAT: WTHB-FM: 121 meters (397 ft)
- Transmitter coordinates: WTHB: 33°30′0.0″N 81°56′3.0″W; WTHB-FM: 33°15′33″N 82°17′7.4″W

Links
- Public license information: WTHB: Public file; LMS; WTHB-FM: Public file; LMS
- Webcast: Listen live
- Website: csrapraise.com

WTHB (1550 AM) and WTHB-FM (96.9 FM) are Christian radio stations simulcasting an urban gospel format, serving the Augusta metropolitan area and owned by Perry Publishing and Broadcasting. WTHB is licensed to Augusta, Georgia, and WTHB-FM is licensed to Wrens, Georgia. Both stations carry the nationally syndicated morning gospel show hosted by Erica Campbell and an afternoon talk radio show hosted by Al Sharpton.

WTHB's studios and transmitter are co-located in North Augusta, South Carolina, while WTHB-FM's transmitter is located in Matthews, Georgia.

== History ==
96.9 signed on as WYFA in 1988 as an outlet for the Bible Broadcasting Network. It was sold, becoming WAEW in 1993 and WAEJ in 1994 (The latter as a simulcast of UC formatted WAEG as "The New 92.3 and 100.9 The Beat").

Radio One acquired the station(s) in 2001 and flipped to a mostly-automated CHR format while still using "The Beat" branding. By 2002, the simulcast with 92.3 was dropped and 100.9 switched to Urban Gospel under the WTHB call sign.

In August 2007, Radio One sold its Augusta stations (including WTHB) to Perry Broadcasting. On January 11, 2008, the station switched frequencies with sister WAKB and moved to 96.9 FM, a weaker signal. To boost its coverage, it simulcasts with WTHB 1550 AM.

WTHB 1550 AM originally signed on the air in May 1960. For nearly all its history, it has broadcast to Augusta's African American community.

== See also ==
- Media in Augusta, Georgia
