= KRHZ =

Radio station in Tulsa, Oklahoma

- Tulsa, Oklahoma; United States
- Broadcast area: Tulsa metropolitan area
- Frequency: 103.3 MHz (HD Radio)
- Branding: 103.3 The Eagle

Programming
- Language: English
- Format: Classic rock

Ownership
- Owner: Zoellner Media Group LLC
- Sister stations: KRAV-FM; KRMG; KRMG-FM; KWEN

History
- First air date: November 1, 1966; 59 years ago
- Former call signs: KORU (1966–1973); KKUL (1973–1978); KTFX (1978–1995); KJSR (1995–2025)
- Call sign meaning: Robert H. Zoellner (owner of Zoellner Media Group)

Technical information
- Licensing authority: FCC
- Facility ID: 9801
- Class: C
- ERP: 100,000 watts
- HAAT: 395 meters (1,296 ft)
- Transmitter coordinates: 36°01′15″N 95°39′28″W

Links
- Public license information: Public file; LMS
- Webcast: Listen live; Listen live (via Audacy)
- Website: www.1033theeagle.com

KRHZ (103.3 FM, "103.3 The Eagle") is a classic rock formatted radio station in Tulsa, Oklahoma, United States. The station is owned by Zoellner Media Group LLC, with studios located in South Tulsa. KRHZ's transmitter facilities are located in western Wagoner County, near Coweta, Oklahoma.

KRHZ simulcasts on Cox Communications digital cable channel 1981 in Tulsa. KOKI also provides traffic and weather information.

== History ==
The station signed on the air in 1966 as religious KORU, owned by famed Tulsa-based televangelist Oral Roberts. The studios and transmitter were located in the iconic Prayer Tower on the ORU campus. Oral Roberts sold the station in 1972 to Central Broadcast Company, at which time it became an urban contemporary (or soul) format station as KKUL "K-Cool"; the transmitter was also moved from the Prayer Tower. In 1977, KKUL was sold to William H. "Bill" Payne; the next year, it changed to Top 40 as KTFX "The Superfox 103".

In November 1979, KTFX changed to a country format as "The Country Fox", which lasted until 1995. It was the first station to air a full-time country music format on FM in the Tulsa market.

In January 1995, KTFX was sold to Cox Radio, and flipped to a classic hits format as KJSR "Star 103.3"; the format would later morph into classic rock. The KTFX calls and country format moved to 102.3 (now News/Talk KRMG-FM) in 1995.

On October 9, 2012, at midnight, KJSR rebranded as "Rock 103", adding the Billy Madison Show and shifting the music library to add more 80s and 90s harder rock. On April 10, 2014, KJSR re-imaged as "103.3 The Eagle" and dropped the Billy Madison Show, maintaining the classic rock format, albeit somewhat softer.

On May 19, 2025, Dr. Robert Zoellner's Zoellner Media Group entered in an agreement with Cox Media Group to acquire the company's radio cluster in Tulsa for $20 million. The sale was completed on August 15, 2025.

On October 3, 2025, KJSR changed its call letters to KRHZ.
