= KIZS =

Radio station in Collinsville, Oklahoma

Coordinates: 36.334°N 95.786°W

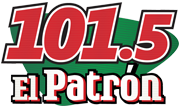
- Collinsville, Oklahoma; United States
- Broadcast area: Tulsa metropolitan area
- Frequency: 101.5 MHz (HD Radio)
- Branding: 101.5 El Patrón

Programming
- Format: Regional Mexican
- Subchannels: HD2: Oldies (iHeart 60s)

Ownership
- Owner: iHeartMedia; (iHM Licenses, LLC)
- Sister stations: KAKC; KMOD-FM; KTBT; KTBZ; KTGX

History
- First air date: June 25, 1996 (as KQSY)
- Former call signs: KOUH (1991–1992, CP); KLTO (1992–1995, CP); KQSY (1995–1997); KMRX (1997–2002); KTBT (2002–2005)
- Call sign meaning: "KISS" (former branding)

Technical information
- Licensing authority: FCC
- Facility ID: 7669
- Class: C3
- ERP: 6,200 watts
- HAAT: 200 meters (660 ft)

Links
- Public license information: Public file; LMS
- Webcast: Listen live
- Website: 1015elpatron.iheart.com

KIZS (101.5 MHz "101.5 El Patrón") is a commercial radio station licensed to Collinsville, Oklahoma, United States, and serving the Tulsa metropolitan area. It airs a regional Mexican format and is owned by iHeartMedia The studios are in the Tulsa Event Center on South Memorial Drive near Interstate 44 in Southeast Tulsa.

KIZS has an effective radiated power (ERP) of 6,200 watts. Its transmitter tower is on East 124th Street near Oklahoma State Highway 20 in Owasso. KIZS is licensed by the FCC to broadcast in the HD Radio hybrid format. Its HD2 subchannel plays oldies from the 1960s, from iHeartRadio. That feeds an FM translator in Stillwater at 103.1 MHz.

== History ==
The station signed on the air on June 25, 1996. Its original call sign was KQSY, the FM sister station to KCFO 970 AM. Its first few years, KQSY and KCFO simulcast their programming. But KQSY later changed to Christian rock.

Clear Channel Communications, the forerunner to iHeartMedia, acquired the station in October 1997. After Clear Channel took over, the station flipped to modern adult contemporary as KMRX in November. KMRX reverted back to Christian rock in February 2001. On July 11, 2002, KMRX switched to rhythmic contemporary as KTBT, "101.5 The Beat."

On September 23, 2005, at 5 pm. KTBT moved to the much stronger 92.1 FM frequency to better compete with 106.9 KHITS. KTBT's former home on 101.5 FM adopted the "La Preciosa" brand featuring Spanish oldies music, along with the KIZS call letters that were moved from 92.1 FM.

== Translators ==
Broadcast translator for KIZS
Call sign	Frequency	City of license	FID	ERP (W)	HAAT	Class	FCC info
K276DZ	103.1 FM	Stillwater, Oklahoma	82390	250	9 m (30 ft)	D	LMS
