= Sergio LaCour =

Broadcast personality

Sergio LaCour (born Keith Samuels in 1967) is an American radio announcer, broadcast personality, and community advocate. He has worked in radio programming across the Pacific Northwest, Midwest, and Southern United States. Lacour is a member of Prince Hall Freemasonry and the Prince Hall-affiliated Shriners.

== Early life and education ==
Lacour was born Keith Samuels in 1967 in Tulsa, Oklahoma. He attended Booker T. Washington High School, and spent time at RadioVision, a broadcast facility located across the street. He was mentored by Michael Hightower, an R&B radio announcer.

== Career ==
Samuels adopted the broadcasting moniker "Sergio LaCour" early in his career.

Lacour has held on-air roles at KNHC, KKFX "K-Fox", and KRIZ in Seattle. When Lacour joined KRIZ radio in the mid-1980s, Northwest broadcasting legend Frank P. Barrow became his mentor. He has also worked at KJMM "K-Jamz 105.3" and KBLK & KTOW in Tulsa, Oklahoma. During the early 1990s, when KTOW-FM flipped to urban contemporary as "Mix 102.3", he hosted the Afternoon Traffic Jam. He served listeners in Denver at KDKO at 1510 AM, before moving to WBRO in Waynesboro, Georgia. He also worked at KBMS in Portland and KYIZ in Seattle, WA.

Lacour became recognized for his interactive community formats that combined rhythm and blues tracks with listener call-ins. Sergio LaCour's Love Lines is a long-running, two-hour interactive broadcast focusing on relationships, listener advice, and classic slow jams. The Weekend Jamz Show began in late 2024, when Lacour expanded his regional broadcast footprint via synchronized syndication through the Z-Twins Radio Network.

== Personal life ==
Lacour is a member of Prince Hall Affiliation (PHA), Pyramid Lodge No. 69 in Tulsa, Oklahoma, working under the jurisdiction of the Most Worshipful Prince Hall Grand Lodge of Oklahoma. and AEAONMS (Prince Hall Shriners), Zoan Temple No. 100 of the Ancient Egyptian Arabic Order Nobles Mystic Shrine, based in the Oasis of Tulsa, Desert of Oklahoma.
