= Black Chronicle =

African-American newspaper from Oklahoma

- Type: Weekly newspaper
- Format: Broadsheet
- Owner: Perry Publishing and Broadcasting
- Publisher: Russell Perry
- Managing editor: Al Lindsey
- Founded: 1979; 46 years ago
- Headquarters: Oklahoma City, Oklahoma
- Circulation: 33,000
- OCLC number: 19836563
- Website: blackchronicle.com

The Black Chronicle is an African-American weekly newspaper in the state of Oklahoma. Founded in April 1979 and based in Oklahoma City's Eastside, it is owned by Perry Publishing and Broadcasting and caters to Oklahoma City's black community. Today, the Black Chronicle has the largest paid circulation among Oklahoma's weekly newspapers.

The Black Chronicle is descended from its predecessor, the Black Dispatch, which published since 1915, founded by Roscoe Dunjee and later published by John Dungee. After the death of John Dungee it was sold to a longtime employee, Russell Perry.

On the 7th of April 2025 the Oklahoma Senate passed Senate Resolution 13, honoring Russell M. Perry for his remarkable contributions to the state as a businessman, banker, and journalist.

Authored and presented by Senator Shane Jett, state of Oklahoma, who is the state senator from Senate District 17, which includes northern Pottawatomie County and eastern Oklahoma County, the resolution commended Perry for founding The Black Chronicle and establishing Perry Publishing & Broadcasting, now Oklahoma’s largest independent radio group.

The newspaper operates out of Oklahoma City’s Eastside, a neighborhood with deep cultural and historical significance for the city’s black residents. Its coverage includes local news, editorials, profiles of community leaders, and discussions of issues like education, economic empowerment, and social justice, all tailored to the interests and concerns of its African-American readership.
