= KTBT =

Radio station in Broken Arrow, Oklahoma

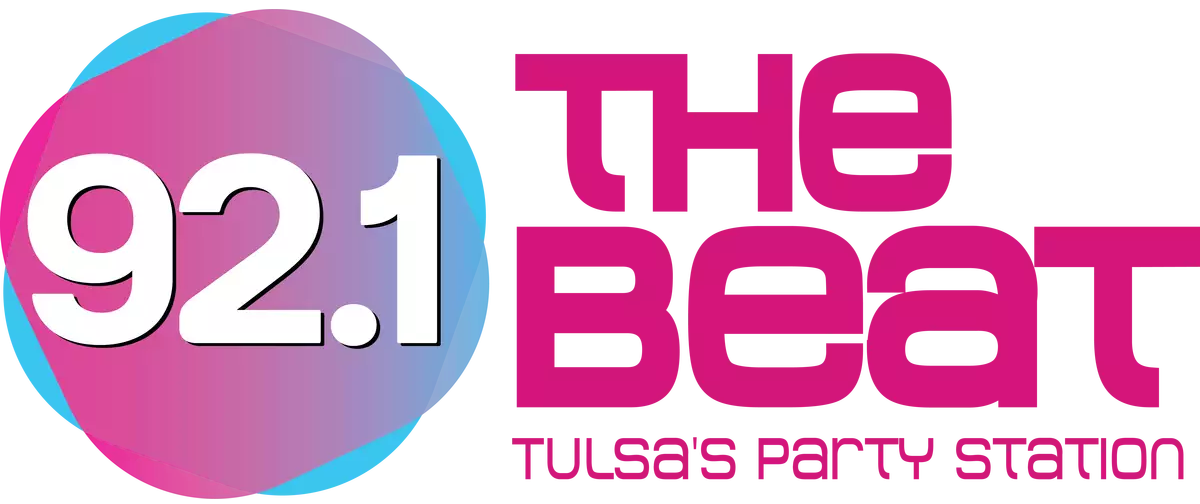
- Broken Arrow, Oklahoma; United States
- Broadcast area: Tulsa metropolitan area
- Frequency: 92.1 MHz (HD Radio)
- Branding: 92.1 The Beat

Programming
- Language: English
- Format: Contemporary hit radio
- Affiliations: Compass Media Networks; Premiere Networks

Ownership
- Owner: iHeartMedia; (iHM Licenses, LLC)
- Sister stations: KAKC; KIZS; KMOD-FM; KTBZ; KTGX

History
- First air date: December 23, 1970
- Former call signs: KTBA (1970–1975); KGOW (1975–1980); KMYO (1980–1982); KSNY (1982–1984); KELI-FM (1984–1985); KQZZ (1985–1986); KCMA (1986–1995); KOAS (1995–2000); KIZS (2000–2005)
- Call sign meaning: "Tulsa's Beat" or "The Beat of Tulsa"

Technical information
- Licensing authority: FCC
- Facility ID: 33727
- Class: C2
- ERP: 27,000 watts
- HAAT: 200 meters (660 ft)
- Transmitter coordinates: 36°6′38.3″N 96°1′57.9″W

Links
- Public license information: Public file; LMS
- Webcast: Listen live (via iHeartRadio)
- Website: 921thebeat.iheart.com

KTBT (92.1 FM "92.1 The Beat") is a rhythmic-leaning contemporary hit radio station licensed to Broken Arrow, Oklahoma, serving the Tulsa metropolitan area. Its studios are located at the Tulsa Event Center in Southeast Tulsa, and its transmitter site is near Lookout Mountain in southwest Tulsa. The iHeartMedia outlet broadcasts with an ERP of 27 kW.

KTBT broadcasts in the HD digital format.

== History ==
KTBT's format history includes freeform rock in the early 1970s as KTBA, Country as KGOW in the late 1970s, and adult contemporary as "Sunny 92", KSNE. It switched formats to top 40 as KELI-FM in December 1983, which also simulcasted with its AM counterpart KELI (1430 AM, now sports KTBZ) as "14K & 92K", and became KQZZ in August 1985. On March 14, 1986, the station became the new home of Classical music-formatted KCMA, which moved from its previous home on 106.1 FM (now KTGX). In December 1994, the classical format moved to 1430 AM, with 92.1 FM flipping to '70s hits as "Y92.1". On August 9, 1995, the station flipped to Smooth Jazz as KOAS, "92.1 The Oasis", giving Tulsa its first Smooth Jazz station at the time. The Smooth Jazz format was dropped in December 1999, and flipped back to Top 40 as "92.1 Kiss-FM."

Initially starting as a 1990s/now-type adult contemporary station, KIZS shifted to hot adult contemporary in 2003. After a year as a Hot AC and still seeing no ratings success, it started leaning towards Mainstream Top 40 and went full-time in mid-2004. This lasted only for a short time.

On September 23 2005, at 5 p.m., rhythmic contemporary station KTBT moved to KIZS and replaced their Mainstream Top 40 format. KTBT, which debuted its format in 2002, was originally on 101.5 FM, but was also signal challenged due to spotty coverage. The move to 92.1 FM gave The Beat better coverage in the area. The Mainstream Top 40 format was retained for a time on 92.1's HD2 sub-channel. The 101.5 frequency was then switched to Clear Channel's Spanish-language "La Preciosa" network featuring Spanish Oldies.

Previous logo
