= KBMS =

- Vancouver, Washington; United States
- Broadcast area: Portland, Oregon
- Frequency: 1480 kHz
- Branding: KBMS Radio

Programming
- Format: Urban adult contemporary
- Affiliations: ABC Radio

Ownership
- Owner: Gloria and Christopher Bennett; (Bennett Media Group, LLC)
- Sister stations: KRIZ, KYIZ

History
- First air date: February 2, 1956 (as KRIV)
- Former call signs: KRIV (1956–1958); KPVA (1958–1960); KVAN (1960–1980); KARO (1980–1981); KAAR (1981–1988)
- Call sign meaning: K Best Music Station

Technical information
- Licensing authority: FCC
- Facility ID: 11162
- Class: B
- Power: 1,000 watts day 2,500 watts night
- Transmitter coordinates: 45°36′6.00″N 122°43′6.00″W
- Translator: 97.5 K248DD (Portland)

Links
- Public license information: Public file; LMS
- Website: kbmsradio.com

KBMS (1480 AM) is a radio station broadcasting an urban adult contemporary format. Licensed to Vancouver, Washington, United States, it serves the Portland, Oregon area. The studios are in Vancouver, while the transmitter site is in North Portland at the Smith and Bybee Refuge.

On February 2, 1956, 1480 AM began operations as KRIV in Camas, Washington. On December 30, 1961, the transmitter and additional studio were moved from 1916 N.E. 2nd Ave., in Camas, to 12640 N. Farr Rd. on Hayden Island, Oregon. The location was in the N.W. corner parking area at "Jantzen Beach Amusement Park", which today is about where "Video Only" is at 1860 N. Hayden Island Dr. The studio was in a small building which stood a few feet above ground.

The station is currently owned by Gloria and Christopher Bennett, through licensee Bennett Media Group, LLC; Christopher Bennett is the founder of the Seattle Medium. KBMS is known in Portland's African-American community. KBMS is the only Urban AC station in the Pacific Northwest.

KBMS carries the Tom Joyner Morning Show, "Keeping it Real" with The Reverend Al Sharpton, as well as "Trending Today" with Carl Nelson. The station's programming includes The Weekend Jamz Show with host Sergio LaCour, which debuted in October 2024. The program features a mix of R&B and interactive listener segments and is broadcast on Saturday nights from 7 p.m. to 12 a.m., simulcasting across both KBMS and its sister station, KYIZ..
