= WAEG =

Coordinates: 33.590°N 82.231°W

- Evans, Georgia; United States
- Broadcast area: Augusta, Georgia
- Frequency: 92.3 MHz
- Branding: Smooth Jazz 92.3 FM

Programming
- Format: Smooth jazz
- Affiliations: United Stations Radio Networks

Ownership
- Owner: Perry Publishing and Broadcasting; (Perry Broadcasting of Augusta, Inc.)
- Sister stations: WFXA-FM, WAKB, WTHB

History
- First air date: 1992 (as WYFZ)
- Former call signs: WYFZ (1991–1994)
- Call sign meaning: Augusta; Evans; Georgia

Technical information
- Licensing authority: FCC
- Facility ID: 31941
- Class: A
- ERP: 6,000 watts
- HAAT: 100 meters

Links
- Public license information: Public file; LMS
- Webcast: Listen Live
- Website: 923smoothjazz.com

WAEG (92.3 FM) is a commercial smooth jazz radio station in Evans, Georgia, broadcasting to the Augusta, Georgia area. The station is licensed by the Federal Communications Commission (FCC) to broadcast with an effective radiated power (ERP) of 6 kW. The station's studios (which are shared with its other sister stations) are located at the aptly named intersection of Broadcast Drive and Radio Station Road in North Augusta, South Carolina, while a transmitter tower is located northwest of Evans.

== History ==
92.3 FM signed on in mid-1992 as WAFJ, as a simulcast of Bible Broadcasting Network's 100.9 WYFA Waynesboro. In June 1994, both stations were sold and switched to an urban contemporary format as "The New 92.3 and 100.9 The Beat" with 92.3 picking up the WAEG call letters.

Radio One acquired the simulcast in 2001 and switched it to CHR format while still using "The Beat" brand. By 2002, the station simulcast was broken off causing 100.9 to drop from the air. Within a year, 92.3 switched formats to Modern Rock while 100.9 was launched as WTHB-FM, a gospel station.

In August 2007, Perry Publishing and Broadcasting acquired Radio One's cluster of Augusta stations. Immediately after, WAEG's format was changed to Smooth Jazz. This move left Augusta without a modern rock station, except for the wide variety of rock that plays on WGAC-FM 95.1, or the very few that play on WHHD 98.3.

WAEG, which features programming from the Smooth Jazz Network, is one of the few terrestrial smooth jazz stations remaining on analog radio in the United States.

== See also ==
- Media in Augusta, Georgia
