= Sheila Butt =

American politician (born 1951)

Sheila Keckler Butt

Mayor of Maury County
- Incumbent
- Assumed office August 30, 2022
- Preceded by: Andy Ogles

Member of the Tennessee House of Representatives from the 64th district
- In office January 11, 2011 – January 8, 2019
- Preceded by: Ty Cobb
- Succeeded by: Scott Cepicky

Personal details
- Born: Sheila Keckler; November 20, 1951 (age 75) Rockford, Illinois, U.S.
- Party: Republican
- Spouse: Stan R. Butt
- Children: 3
- Education: East Tennessee State University (BS)
- Website: House website

Sheila Keckler Butt (born November 20, 1951) is an American politician from Columbia, Tennessee, currently serving as the mayor of Maury County. Butt is the former Republican Majority Floor Leader of the Tennessee House of Representatives and she formerly represented House District 64, encompassing the cities of Columbia, Mount Pleasant, and Spring Hill in parts of Maury County, Tennessee. She retired from the House in 2018, and she was replaced by Republican Scott Cepicky in the subsequent election. On August 4, 2022, Butt was elected Maury County Mayor, succeeding incumbent Andy Ogles, who instead ran for an open U.S. House of Representatives seat. Butt was sworn in as county mayor on August 30.

== Biography ==
=== Early life ===
Butt was born on November 20, 1951, in Rockford, Illinois. Butt's father was a shoe salesman and later a car salesman, while her mother was described by Butt as a "domestic engineer". In the Keckler home that she shared with her parents and four siblings, Butt described her family that she grew up with as having "strong faith," but that her family never participated in organized religion. Butt was also both a high school cheerleader and a high school newspaper editor.

Butt also says in her book, Everyday Princess: Daughter of the King, that while she never drank alcohol or used drugs growing up, she did "date plenty of boys". Those boys drew Butt to Tennessee Technological University where she said boys outnumbered girls 7-to-1. According to Butt, Tennessee Tech was fun, except for that frat party where she said a man pulled his pants down and danced behind her. "Needless to say, I decided that night that I would not be dancing at parties anymore," Butt wrote. Butt wasn't always a Christian and did not make that decision until she was 20 years old, according to her book Everyday Princess: Daughter of the King.

Butt later received a Bachelor of Science cum laude in English with a History minor from East Tennessee State University and is also a 1980 Women's Certificate Program graduate of the Bear Valley School of Biblical Studies.

=== Career ===
Butt was a co-founder and managing editor of S&S Bovine Images and also co-founder and managing editor of Tennessee Cattle Business, the official publication of the TN Cattlemen's Association --- two companies focused on marketing and promoting the Tennessee cattle industry --- and she has served as a lecturer at Freed-Hardeman University and was a managing partner of MacInk Printers, Inc.

==== Tennessee General Assembly ====
Butt served as a member of the Tennessee House of Representatives until 2018. She sponsored HJR 199, a resolution to federal government to follow Tennessee model of a balanced budget, and co-sponsored HB0007 for Voter Identification.

Butt currently controls her own political action committee that was started up for the 2014 elections in Tennessee, the Sheila's Liberty PAC of Columbia, Tennessee. According to Tennessee Online Campaign Finance database, the Sheila's Liberty PAC Treasurer is Jacob Love of Heritage Bank & Trust in Columbia, Tennessee.

===== NAAWP Twitter post =====
In her book Everyday Princess: Daughter of the King, Butt posed the following leading questions pertaining to biracial dating toward the young female readers on her book:

...Will dating someone of another race be helpful or beneficial? Understanding that you will eventually marry someone that you date, will you be just as happy for your children to grow up biracial? I have seen instances when a young lady started dating someone of another race, and there were those of her own race who were not interested in dating her after that.

In a 2015 tweet critical of the Council on American-Islamic Relations (CAIR), Butt called for the creation of both a Council on Christian Relations and an NAAWP organization in the United States, presumably the National Association for the Advancement of White People. The comment was made on a post by Cathy Hinners, an anti-Muslim activist who operates the Daily Roll Call blog. The NAAWP is a white nationalist organization that was formed in opposition to the National Association for the Advancement of Colored People, which itself was earlier formed during 1909.

Butt was reportedly commenting on an open letter from the CAIR urging potential Republican presidential candidates to reject Islamophobia and reach out to American Muslim voters. CAIR representatives stated the reference to "NAAWP" is an apparent racist twist to the name of the National Association for the Advancement of Colored People, or NAACP.

Butt responded to the backlash resulting from her NAAWP statement in part by stating: "It saddens me that we have come to a place in our society where every comment by a conservative Christian is automatically scrutinized as being racist". The Tennessee Black Caucus is now calling for both an apology and the removal of Rep. Butt from leadership in the Tennessee House of Representatives.

Butt later deleted her NAAWP post on Twitter and said in response to suggestions that "NAAWP" was a racist abbreviation for the "National Association for the Advancement of White People," that she had been "misinterpreted" and was offended by the reaction from critics. Butt attempted to walk back her NAAWP Twitter post by stating she actually meant "National Association for the Advancement of Western Peoples" to be widely understood for her NAAWP Twitter post.

===== Legal abortion =====
Butt has been on the record as being opposed to making exceptions for abortion waiting periods when the survivor has been a victim of incest or rape. During a 2015 debate in the House, Butt said that most instances of rape or incest are "not verifiable" and stated that an amendment brought to the House Floor to provide for exceptions for rape and incest victims "appears political". Butt's remarks were criticized on the floor of the Tennessee House of Representatives as "dangerous and insulting" by TNGA Rep. Sherry Jones who in part stated,

Yesterday we heard a lot of unsettling things on the floor, from bogus descriptions of women's health clinics to a member of this body [TNGA Rep. Sheila Butt] actually saying that the violent crimes of rape and incest are, quote, not verifiable. There are 206,000 women in Tennessee who unfortunately can attest to the fact that rape and incest are too verifiable. Those women have endured horrors that we cannot imagine, and for it to be said the violent crimes they suffered are not verifiable is to suggest that they are somehow not legitimate rapes. That's dangerous and it is insulting to say the very least.

Butt is a member of both the Tennessee Right to Life and the Maury County Right to Life and was a co-sponsor of the SJR0127 bill later approved by voters during 2014 as the Tennessee Amendment 1 ballot question.

===== Tennessee Humane Society =====
During 2014, Butt called for a state investigation by the Office of the Tennessee Attorney General and Reporter into fundraising practices of the Humane Society of the United States.

According to Leighann Lassiter, the state director for HSUS in Tennessee, another legislator who has a contradictory voting record to Rep. Butt described Butt's action as a public official against the HSUS as being a "purely political attack".

Lassiter also claimed Butt used false information from the Internet in asking the state's attorney general to launch an investigation. Butt has asked the attorney general to issue a "Consumer Alert" to raise public awareness about the group's "potential fundraising abuses".

Butt contended that HSUS uses deceitful advertising to attract donors while using donations to pay "inflated salaries and promote a liberal anti-agriculture agenda."

"It's a purely political attack by an extreme lawmaker who doesn't like our agenda to end horse soring and horse slaughter and dog fighting," Lassiter said. "Rep. Butt opposes the mainstream values of cracking down on crime and protecting God's creatures from cruelty.

=== Personal life ===
Butt is married to Stan R. Butt, and has three children.

Butt met Stan at Tennessee Technological University where married, and Sheila left school after one year to start working. After having sons Stan Jr., Cliff and Kyle with her husband and moving to Blountville, Tennessee, Butt returned to college in Johnson City, Tennessee, at East Tennessee State University.

Butt's husband, Stan, preaches for the Anderson Bend Church of Christ in Duck River, Tennessee, and was the executive director of the Tennessee Walking Horse Breeders' and Exhibitors' Association from 2007 to 2011.

One of Butt's sons, Kyle Butt, is the director of Biblical research at Apologetics Press in Montgomery, Alabama, and is an editor of Discovery: A Monthly Christian Evidences Magazine for Kids magazine.

Another of Butt's sons, Cliff Butt, was arrested by the Maury County Sheriff Department on May 7, 2015, for allegedly contributing to the delinquency of a minor with his buying alcohol for a 17-year-old Columbia Academy student who then brought the alcohol to an off-campus prom night party attended by twenty other Columbia Academy students who reportedly consumed beer at the event. Cliff Butt was jailed on one misdemeanor charge and later released from the Maury County Jail after posting a $1,500 bond and he was scheduled to appear in court on the charge on June 10, 2015, in Mt. Pleasant, Tennessee. Cliff Butt was previously serving as a youth minister at the Eastside Church of Christ (now the South Gate Church of Christ) of Columbia, Tennessee.

Butt is a member of the Anderson Bend Church of Christ.

Butt is also member of the National Rifle Association of America, the Tennessee Firearms Association, the Maury Alliance, the Fraternal Order of Police and has served as Secretary of the Maury County Horsemen's Association.

Butt has received the Kay Battles Service Award from Freed–Hardeman University and the Golden Pen Award from Publishing Designs in Huntsville, Alabama.

Butt has authored and self-published several books presenting Biblical teachings for women, children and parents.

== Bibliography ==
=== Author ===
- Everyday Princess: Daughter of the King (book and DVD) Peaceful House Publishing, 2008. Columbia, Tennessee.
- Does God Love Michael's Two Daddies (Montgomery, Alabama: Apologetics Press, 2006)
- Seeking Spiritual Beauty (book and DVD) Peaceful House Publishing, 2002. Huntsville, Alabama.
- No Greater Joy (book and DVD) Peaceful House Publishing, 1999. Huntsville, Alabama.
- If Thine Heart Be Wide Heart Wise Press, 1992. Columbia, Tennessee.

=== Co-author ===
- We Bow Down: Women Look at Worship by Sheila Butt, Cindy Colley, Gloria Ingram, Jane McWhorter, Foye Watkins. 2002. ISBN 978-0929540283 Publishing Designs.
