= Cathy Hinners =

American blogger

- Born: 1960 (age 65–66)
- Occupations: Blogger, activist
- Known for: Anti-Muslim views

Cathy Hinners (born 1960) is an American blogger, activist and former Albany, New York intelligence police officer who currently lives in Tennessee, where she runs the blog Daily Roll Call. She has been named one of the twelve most "hardlined, anti-Muslim" women in America by the Southern Poverty Law Center.

== Career ==
Hinners is a former twenty-year intelligence officer of the Albany, New York Police Department, with a career to a large degree spent providing police services within Albany's Middle Eastern community, where she says she "developed an acute awareness of cultural and ethnic-community traits and characteristics." Based on this experience, she created training seminars for law enforcement after her retirement. She also worked as a sub-contract instructor for the United States Department of Homeland Security's Center for Domestic Preparedness, where she delivered mobile training to members of the New York Police Department, the National Guard, and other law enforcement agencies, with a segment of the class she instructed being on Weapons of Mass Destruction (WMD) and bomb recognition.

== Activities and views ==
Hinners later moved to Spring Hill, Tennessee, where she runs the blog Daily Roll Call, which is devoted to "exploring and exposing Islam in America," and functions as a group of retired law enforcement and military personnel who actively investigate and vet tips given by concerned citizens. In 2012, she took part in stirring up the controversy against the Islamic Center of Murfreesboro.

She has aligned herself with anti-Muslim groups such as ACT for America and the Tennessee Freedom Coalition, and at a Values Voter Summit she has said that "the Muslim Brotherhood has taken hold in Tennessee," and that "in the time of Muhammad, mosques were centers for military activity." She has said that Muslims "follow the Prophet Muhammad, they are violent, they do assault women and use women as slaves, and they do have pedophilia that runs in their bloodstream." She has also spoken at a Tennessee Eagle Forum conference, where she has said that leftists and Islamists are "working toward the same goal of dismantling and destroying the U.S. state by state," and that interfaith dialogue is "deliberately blurring distinctions between Islam and Christianity." Additionally, she has claimed that Common Core is a "secretly Muslim-backed plot to indoctrinate American school children."

Hinners has also been said to "peddle white nationalist conspiracy theories." In response to the 2014 Ferguson unrest, she identified the Council on American–Islamic Relations (CAIR) as "a Muslim terrorist organization", while alleging that CAIR "was using civil unrest following the death of Michael Brown to 'revert those disgruntled blacks to Islam'." She has also criticized the University of Tennessee at Martin's Civil Rights Conference for being a way for "young black activists" to be "recruited by Communists, Socialists and Islamists."

Hinners also travels throughout the country speaking on alleged terrorist organizations' infiltration, and regularly appears on Michael DelGiorno's radio show on Nashville's Super Talk 99.7 each Monday, as well as with Scott Adams Show on Red State Radio, and the Melody Burns show. She has been a guest speaker at local Republican Party events, and Republican Tennessee House Majority Floor Leader Sheila Butt has posted in support of Hinners on Facebook.

She has written for the blog The Counter Jihad Report, and has been described as a part of the counter-jihad movement.

In 2018, Trevecca Nazarene University blocked a "homeland security" event organized by Republican Tennessee gubernatorial candidate Mae Beavers that was scheduled to feature Hinners and two other speakers, John Guandolo and Bill Warner, amid strong criticism from advocacy groups that its speakers were anti-Muslim. Beavers responded that the university was "caving to Islamic pressure."

== Bibliography ==
- Hinners, Cathy (2016). Muslim Brotherhood: The Threat In Our Backyard. CreateSpace Independent Publishing Platform. ISBN 978-1530500178.
