= KBR =

KBR can stand for:

== Places ==
- KBR Park, Hyderabad, India
- Royal Library of Belgium (KBR, Dutch: Koninklijke Bibliotheek van België), Brussels, Belgium
- Sultan Ismail Petra Airport (IATA airport code KBR), Kota Bharu, Kelantan, Malaysia

== Groups, companies, organizations ==
- KBR (company), formerly Kellogg, Brown & Root, US
- KBR (news agency), an Indonesian radio news agency

== Other uses ==
- Kafa language (ISO 639 language code kbr), spoken in Ethiopia
- Key-based routing in computer networking
- Potassium bromide (KBr)

== See also ==
- KBRS (disambiguation)
