= Scott Cepicky =

American politician (born 1966)

Member of the Tennessee House of Representatives from the 64th district
- Incumbent
- Assumed office January 8, 2019
- Preceded by: Sheila Butt

Personal details
- Born: July 29, 1966 (age 60) St. Louis, Missouri, U.S.
- Party: Republican
- Spouse: Teresa Cepicky
- Children: 2
- Education: University of Wisconsin, Madison (BA)
- Website: State House website
- Football career

Profile
- Position: Punter

Personal information
- Listed height: 6 ft 4 in (1.93 m)
- Listed weight: 220 lb (100 kg)

Career information
- High school: Vianney (MO)
- College: Wisconsin
- NFL draft: 1989: undrafted

Career history
- Cincinnati Bengals (1989)*; Minnesota Vikings (1989)*
- * Offseason or practice squad member only

Scott Cepicky (born July 29, 1966) is an American politician and former athlete who serves in the Tennessee House of Representatives, representing the 64th district since 2019. Cepicky is a member of the Republican Party.

== Early life and athletic career ==
Born in St. Louis, Cepicky attended Vianney High School in Kirkwood, Missouri, later attending the University of Wisconsin–Madison where he was a history major. While at Wisconsin, Cepicky also played football and baseball, and after college declared for the 1989 NFL draft, where he went undrafted. Cepicky, a punter, was signed as an undrafted free agent by the Cincinnati Bengals, who cut him during the preseason. He was later picked up by the Minnesota Vikings, where he was also cut before the end of preseason. Moving on from football, Cepicky was drafted by the Chicago White Sox in the 23rd round of the 1989 Major League Baseball draft. He played Minor League Baseball for five teams from 1989 to 1994.

After the end of Cepicky's athletic career, he became a cattle rancher. He also worked as a salesman in the automotive industry.

== Political career ==
Before he ran for office, Cepicky was active in Maury County politics, serving as chair of the county Republican Party and the county Board of Commissioners. Cepicky first ran for office in 2018, seeking to replace Sheila Butt, who was not seeking re-election. Cepicky won a partisan primary against Michael Fulbright, a local realtor, with 53% of the vote. Cepicky advanced to face local photographer AJ Holmes in the general election, winning with 63% of the vote. Cepicky ran unopposed in his primary for the 2020 election, and won against challenger James Campbell with 71% of the vote.

Cepicky is a member of the Insurance & Banking and Education Committees of the Tennessee House of Representatives.

During the COVID-19 pandemic, Cepicky opposed efforts by the Tennessee health department to advertise COVID-19 vaccinations for teenagers. Cepicky proposed that the Tennessee health department should be dissolved if it did not refuse to "peer pressure" teenagers to get vaccinated against COVID-19. Following a mid-June hearing where Cepicky and other conservative lawmakers criticized the Tennessee health department for outreach to teenagers regarding vaccinations, the department stopped its outreach.

In 2020, Cepicky introduced legislation that banned transgender boys and men from playing male sports.

During a special session of the legislature in October 2021, Cepicky co-sponsored controversial legislation allowing partisan school board elections statewide. The initial legislation would have required all school board elections statewide to be partisan, but was trimmed to allow local parties to call for partisan school board elections after some GOP opposition. The legislation still had the result of making most school board elections statewide partisan, however. This act was strongly believed to be an attempt to reduce the ability of Democrats and people with Democrat-leaning views to win election to school boards throughout the state, and to have been motivated by GOP opposition to critical race theory, mask mandates, and a perception of increasing liberalization of education throughout the country. The legislation was opposed by the Tennessee School Board Association and many school districts throughout the state.

In 2023, Cepicky supported a resolution to expel three Democratic lawmakers from the legislature for violating decorum rules. The expulsion was widely characterized as unprecedented. During a subsequent meeting the next week with the Republican caucus, Cepicky criticized Representative Jody Barrett for voting against the resolution to expel Representative Gloria Johnson.

In February 2023, Cepicky suggested that lettuce should be labeled as containing vaccines, introducing a bill which would prohibit manufacturing, delivering, and selling food that has a vaccine in it, unless the labeling identifies it as such. The bill, HB0032, was signed into law on April 22, 2024.

== Personal life ==
Cepicky is married to Teresa Cepicky, and the couple have two children. He is a mortgage banker and also coaches football and baseball at Spring Hill High School in Columbia, Tennessee. Cepicky is a member of the Church of Christ but is of Ashkenazi Jewish descent.
