= KGTO =

Radio station in Tulsa, Oklahoma

- Tulsa, Oklahoma; United States
- Broadcast area: Tulsa metropolitan area
- Frequency: 1050 kHz
- Branding: Heart & Soul 99.1 & 1050

Programming
- Language: English
- Format: Urban adult contemporary

Ownership
- Owner: Perry Publishing and Broadcasting; (KJMM, Inc.)
- Sister stations: KJMM

History
- First air date: 1946
- Former call signs: KFMJ (1946–1981); KRAV (1981–1982)
- Call sign meaning: "Greater Tulsa's Oldies"

Technical information
- Licensing authority: FCC
- Facility ID: 65766
- Class: D
- Power: 1,000 watts (day); 22 watts (night)
- Transmitter coordinates: 36°9′35″N 96°3′9″W
- Translator: 99.1 K256CR (Tulsa)

Links
- Public license information: Public file; LMS
- Webcast: Listen live
- Website: tulsaheartandsoul.com

KGTO (1050 AM) is a radio station in Tulsa, Oklahoma, United States. The station is owned by Perry Publishing and Broadcasting and licensed to KJMM, Inc. It airs an urban adult contemporary music format. Its studios are located in the Copper Oaks complex in South Tulsa.

== History ==
The station signed on the air in 1946 as KFMJ. The station was owned by Fred Jones (who was a well-known auto dealer at the time) and the call sign "F-M-J" came from Jones' and his wife Mary's initials of their first and last names.

The station's original format was "middle of the road" contemporary, jazz and gospel music and some news.

In April 1966, George R. Kravis II (president of the Boston Broadcasting Company and owner of KRAV-FM at the time) bought the station to pair with KRAV-FM. The call sign was then changed to KRAV (AM) in 1981.

The station then was assigned the KGTO call letters by the Federal Communications Commission since February 1, 1982, having chosen them to signify "Greater Tulsa's Oldies", a format change.

KGTO's transmitter site at 5400 West Edison was depicted in 1988 in UHF as the location of fictional television station "U-62". While a transmitter tower remains at this location, the original building at the site was removed in 2001.

In 1996, Kravis sold KGTO and KRAV to Cox Radio for $5.5 million.

In 1999, the station was purchased by Perry Publishing and Broadcasting and becoming a duopoly of KJMM. Two years later in 2001, the station flipped to an urban contemporary radio station as a result of Perry Publishing purchasing the station.

== Former logo ==
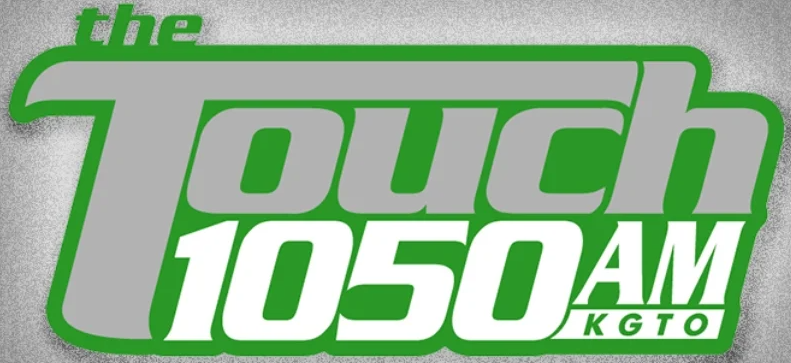
Former name of the station from 2011 to 2016.

== Translator ==
Call sign	Frequency	City of license	FID	ERP (W)	HAAT	Class	FCC info
K256CR	99.1 FM	Tulsa, Oklahoma	156338	250	134 m (440 ft)	D	LMS
