= KFTP =

- Duncan, Oklahoma; United States
- Frequency: 1350 kHz

Programming
- Format: News/Talk

Ownership
- Owner: Hilliary Broadcasting Co. Inc.
- Sister stations: KJMZ, KKEN, KXCA, KKRX, KACO, KWCO-FM

History
- Former call signs: KRHD (1947–1998); KKEN (1998–2000); KXCD (2000–2003); KPNS (2003–2023)

Technical information
- Licensing authority: FCC
- Facility ID: 17730
- Class: D
- Power: 180 watts day 70 watts night
- Transmitter coordinates: 34°30′43″N 97°58′5″W
- Translator: 106.1 K291CT (Duncan)

Links
- Public license information: Public file; LMS
- Webcast: Listen Live
- Website: newstalk1350.com

KFTP (1350 AM) is a radio station licensed to Duncan, Oklahoma, United States. The station is currently owned by Mollman Media, Inc.

== History ==
The station was assigned the call sign KRHD from 1947 thru 1998 and was named after its original owner R.H. Drewry. The station switched its call sign to KKEN on January 26, 1998. On January 28, 2000, the station changed its call sign to KXCD and on February 18, 2003, to KPNS.

On October 16, 2023, the station changed its call sign to KFTP.

In December 2025, Hilliary Broadcasting Co. Inc. purchased KFTP-AM and closed on the sale on June 10, 2026.
