= KACO (FM) =

Radio station in Apache–Lawton, Oklahoma

- Apache, Oklahoma; United States
- Broadcast area: Lawton/Fort Sill
- Frequency: 98.5 MHz
- Branding: New Country 98.5

Programming
- Format: Country
- Affiliations: Compass Media Networks

Ownership
- Owner: (Hilliary Broadcasting Co Inc.)
- Sister stations: KWCO-FM, KJMZ, KKEN, KXCA, KFTP, KKRX

History
- First air date: June 24, 1974 (as KRRO at 92.1)
- Former call signs: KRRO (1974–1982); KELS-FM (1982–1984); KEBQ (1984–1987); KRDM (1987–1995); KRXZ (1995–1997)
- Former frequencies: 92.1 (1974–1984); 96.5 MHz (1986–1997)

Technical information
- Licensing authority: FCC
- Facility ID: 70015
- Class: C3
- ERP: 18,500 watts
- HAAT: 93 meters
- Transmitter coordinates: 34°56′30″N 98°22′33″W

Links
- Public license information: Public file; LMS
- Webcast: Listen Live
- Website: newcountry985.com

KACO (98.5 MHz) is an FM radio station licensed to Apache, Oklahoma, United States. The station is currently owned by Hilliary Broadcasting Co. Inc.

KACO broadcasts a country music format to the Lawton, Oklahoma, area.

== History ==
The station was first licensed in Ardmore, Oklahoma, and launched on June 24, 1974, as KRRO with a country format. On March 15, 1982, the station changed its call sign to KELS-FM and flipped its format to Top 40. On June 1, 1984, the station changed its call sign to KEBQ which had a "Q92" branding, and on February 2, 1987, to KRDM, retaining its Top 40 format during both call sign changes. By the early 1990s, the station's format went towards adult contemporary, but in October 1992, the station went silent. On October 15, 1995, the station returned back on the air after a three-year hiatus as KRXZ with a country format, and finally on January 6, 1997, to the current KACO.

On June 29, 2019, KACO signed off Superstar Country at 8:58 Local time with Gone By Montgomery Gentry and at noon started stunting with Blake Shelton Goodbye Time. On July 1, 2019, KA ended stunting and relaunched as "New Country 98.5".

In December 2025, Hilliary Broadcasting Co. Inc. purchased KACO and closed on the sale on June 10, 2026.
