= KTGX =

Radio station in Owasso, Oklahoma

- Owasso, Oklahoma; United States
- Broadcast area: Tulsa metropolitan area
- Frequency: 106.1 MHz (HD Radio)
- Branding: 106.1 The Twister

Programming
- Format: Country
- Subchannels: HD2: KAKC simulcast (Conservative talk)
- Affiliations: Premiere Networks

Ownership
- Owner: iHeartMedia; (iHM Licenses, LLC)
- Sister stations: KAKC; KIZS; KMOD-FM; KTBT; KTBZ

History
- First air date: October 1, 1981 (as KVLT)
- Former call signs: KVLT (1981–1990); KQLL-FM (1990–2009)
- Call sign meaning: Tulsa Gen X (previous format)

Technical information
- Licensing authority: FCC
- Facility ID: 68294
- Class: C
- ERP: 100,000 watts
- HAAT: 403 meters (1,322 ft)
- Transmitter coordinates: 36°31′37″N 95°39′13″W
- Translator: HD2: 93.5 K228BR (Tulsa)

Links
- Public license information: Public file; LMS
- Webcast: Listen live
- Website: 1061thetwister.iheart.com

KTGX (106.1 MHz "The Twister") is a commercial FM radio station licensed to Owasso, Oklahoma, United States, and serving the Tulsa metropolitan area. It airs a country music format and is owned by iHeartMedia. The studios are in the BancFirst building at the southwest corner of 71st Street and Yale Avenue in Southeast Tulsa. In morning drive time it carries the nationally syndicated Bobby Bones Show. Local DJs include Karla Cantrell, Natalie Cash and Kasper. Overnight, the station carries After Midnight with Granger Smith.

KTGX has an effective radiated power (ERP) of 100,000 watts, the maximum for most FM stations in the U.S. The transmitter is on East 340 Road in Talala, Oklahoma.

== HD programming ==
KTGX broadcasts using HD Radio technology. The HD2 digital subchannel was originally called "Christmas 93.5" playing Christmas music. It was also simulcast on FM translator K228BR at 93.5 MHz. It later became "93.5 Chrome FM" playing Oldies.

On November 3, 2017, KTGX-HD2 dropped its oldies format and returned to Christmas music, branded again as "Christmas 93.5".

On January 24, 2018, "Christmas 93.5" was dropped and "93.5 The Jet" was launched with a classic rock format.

On September 9, 2024, KTGX-HD2 changed their format from classic rock to a simulcast of conservative talk-formatted KAKC 1300 AM Tulsa, branded as "93.5/1300 The Patriot".

== Translator ==
Broadcast translator for KTGX-HD2
| Call sign | Frequency | City of license | FID | ERP (W) | HAAT | Class | FCC info |
|---|---|---|---|---|---|---|---|
| K228BR | 93.5 FM | Tulsa, Oklahoma | 68292 | 250 | 73.4 m (241 ft) | D | LMS |

== Formats ==
Before KTGX launched on December 28, 2009, the station aired an oldies format, branded as "KOOL 106.1" with the call letters KQLL-FM. The format launched in 1990.

Before the launch of KOOL, the station aired an adult contemporary format as "Lite 106," and before that, broadcast hits from the 1960s and 1970s.

On October 30, 2009, at 6 a.m., KQLL-FM began stunting with all-Christmas music as "Christmas 106, Tulsa's Holiday Station."

At noon on December 28, 2009, KQLL-FM relaunched as 1990s hits 106.1 Gen-X Radio with the first song being "Smells Like Teen Spirit" by Nirvana.

At 6 a.m. on July 3, 2012, KTGX began stunting first with all-Christmas music, followed by a loop of all-Bruce Springsteen, then a loop of the song "Boys From Oklahoma" by Cross Canadian Ragweed beginning at 9 a.m., and at 10 a.m., the audio of the film Twister, all punctuated with cryptic liners that a "twister" would hit the station "and it's coming... soon". At Noon, the station flipped to country, branded as "The Twister." The first song on "The Twister" was "Blown Away" by Carrie Underwood.
