= KKRX =

Radio station in Lawton, Oklahoma

KXCA
- Lawton, Oklahoma; United States
- Broadcast area: Lawton, Oklahoma; Lawton, Oklahoma
- Frequency: 1380 kHz
- Branding: Heart and Soul 96.7 and 1380 AM

Programming
- Format: Urban adult contemporary

Ownership
- Owner: Mollman Media, Inc.
- Sister stations: KJMZ, KACO-FM, KWCO-FM, KKEN, KFTP, KXCA

History
- First air date: 1941 (as KSWO)
- Former call signs: KSWO (1941–1998); KXCA (1998–2013); KKRX (2013-2024)

Technical information
- Licensing authority: FCC
- Facility ID: 50213
- Class: B
- Power: 1,000 watts
- Transmitter coordinates: 34°35′24″N 98°21′44″W
- Translator: 96.7 K244DW (Lawton)

Links
- Public license information: Public file; LMS
- Webcast: Listen live
- Website: lawtonheartandsoul.com

KXCA (1380 AM) is a radio station broadcasting an urban adult contemporary format. Licensed to Lawton, Oklahoma, United States, the station serves the Lawton area. The station is currently owned by Mollman Media, Inc.

On February 23, 2024, KKRX changed their format from sports to urban adult contemporary, branded as "Heart and Soul" (simulcasting KXCA 1050 AM Lawton, which changed to Alternative Rock as X-93.7 simulcasting on translator K229DG at 93.7).
