= KXCA =

KKRX
- Lawton, Oklahoma; United States
- Broadcast area: Lawton, Oklahoma
- Frequency: 1050 kHz
- Branding: X93.7

Programming
- Format: Alternative rock

Ownership
- Owner: Hilliary Broadcasting Co Inc.
- Sister stations: KJMZ, KACO, KWCO-FM, KKEN, KFTP, KKRX

History
- First air date: 1956 (as KCCO)
- Former call signs: KCCO (1956–1987); KKRX (1987–2013)

Technical information
- Licensing authority: FCC
- Facility ID: 61593
- Class: D
- Power: 250 watts day 6 watts night
- ERP: FM: 250 watts (24 hours)
- Transmitter coordinates: 34°35′27″N 98°21′10″W
- Translator: 93.7 K229DG (Lawton)

Links
- Public license information: Public file; LMS
- Webcast: Listen live
- Website: x937lawton.com

KKRX (1050 AM, "X93.7") is a radio station broadcasting an alternative rock format. Licensed to Lawton, Oklahoma, United States, the station serves the Lawton area. The station is currently owned by Hilliary Broadcasting Co Inc. Studios and transmitter are located on Flower Mound Road in eastern Lawton.

On February 23, 2024, KXCA and its urban adult contemporary format began simulcasting on KKRX 1380 AM Lawton in preparation of the format moving to KKRX when a new format launches on KXCA.

On March 1, 2024, KXCA dropped its simulcast with KKRX and launched an alternative rock format, branded as "X93.7".

In December 2025, Hilliary Broadcasting Co. Inc. purchased KKRX and closed on the sale on June 10, 2026.

== Translator ==
Broadcast translator for KKRX
Call sign	Frequency	City of license	FID	ERP (W)	HAAT	Class	FCC info
K229DG	93.7 FM	Lawton, Oklahoma	156448	250	65 m (213 ft)	D	LMS
