= The Doug Banks Radio Show =

American radio show

- Running time: 240 minutes
- Country of origin: United States
- Language(s): English
- Home station: WVAZ
- Syndicates: American Urban Radio Networks
- Starring: Doug Banks; Dee Dee Renee; George Willborn; DeDe McGuire (2008-2014); Rudy Rush
- Recording studio: Chicago, Illinois
- Original release: January 11, 2008 – August 2016

The Doug Banks Radio Show was an American radio show produced by American Urban Radio Networks hosted by veteran radio personalities Doug Banks, Dee Dee Renee and George Willborn. It aired daily from 2PM to 6PM (central time).

The show began national syndication on January 11, 2008 from its flagship station WVAZ in Chicago, Illinois as The Ride with Doug and DeDe with DeDe McGuire being the original co-host. A similar show, The Doug Banks Morning Show, aired on ABC Radio Networks for several years prior in the morning drive time slot. Prior to 2010, Banks was aired on Citadel Media and its predecessor, ABC Radio Networks. The show was renamed The Doug Banks Radio Show when it moved to AURN July 28, 2010. In late 2014, DeDe McGuire announced that she would be leaving to continue working on her own show "DeDe in the Morning". After DeDe McGuire departure from the show she was replaced with Virginia native Dee Dee Renee

Originally available for national syndication through The Touch (as well as stations in over 50 markets 3 days later), the show offers a blend of music and entertainment targeting a unique 25-40 demographic in the Urban Adult Contemporary group of afternoon drivetime.

Banks died on April 11, 2016, shortly before that day's episode of the show was to air.
