= KRMG-FM =

Radio station in Tulsa, Oklahoma

Simulcast of KRMG, Tulsa
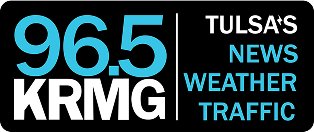
- Tulsa, Oklahoma; United States
- Broadcast area: Tulsa metropolitan area
- Frequency: 96.5 MHz (HD Radio)
- Branding: 96.5 KRMG Tulsa's News, Weather, & Traffic

Programming
- Format: News/talk
- Affiliations: ABC News Radio; CBS News Radio (until 2026); Fox News Radio; Compass Media Networks; Premiere Networks; Big Apple Media; Westwood One

Ownership
- Owner: Zoellner Media Group LLC
- Sister stations: KRHZ; KRAV-FM; KRMG; KWEN

History
- First air date: June 1989; 37 years ago
- Former call signs: KTOW-FM (1988–1995); KTFX (1995–1999); KRTQ (1999–2005); KKCM (2005–2009)
- Call sign meaning: Taken from KRMG (740 AM)

Technical information
- Licensing authority: FCC
- Facility ID: 47102
- Class: C2
- ERP: 100,000 watts
- HAAT: 453 meters (1,486 ft)
- Transmitter coordinates: 36.196°N 96.098°W

Links
- Public license information: Public file; LMS
- Webcast: Listen live Listen live (via Audacy)
- Website: www.krmg.com

KRMG-FM (96.5 MHz) is a commercial radio station in Tulsa, Oklahoma, United States. The station is owned by Zoellner Media Group LLC and simulcasts a news/talk radio format with co-owned AM 740 KRMG.

The studios and offices are on South Memorial Drive near Interstate 44 in Tulsa. KRMG-FM's transmitter is on Route 97 on the Osage Reservation in Sand Springs.

== History ==
In June 1989, the station first signed on as KTOW-FM. It was owned by Music Sound Radio and was the FM counterpart of KTOW (now KJMU), with the two stations simulcasting a modern rock format. KTOW-FM ran at only 1,700 watts, a fraction of its current power. In the early 1990s, it shifted to urban contemporary music as "Mix 102.3", giving Tulsa its first urban station on the FM dial since KKUL switched to country music in 1979, with Keith Sergio Lacour Samuels serving as host of KTOW's programming from 3 PM to 6 PM and from 7 PM to 12 AM.

In 1995, KTOW-AM-FM were sold to Bill Payne. KTOW-FM changed to a classic country format as KTFX. Payne received permission from the Federal Communications Commission to increase the station's power to 50,000 watts, allowing it to be heard all across Tulsa and its suburbs.

In 1999, Payne sold the stations to Cox Radio for $3.5 million. Cox changed KTFX's format to active rock as KRTQ ("Rock 102.3") to compete against heritage rock station KMOD-FM, with the KTFX format and call letters moving to KTFX-FM in Warner/Muskogee. In 2005, KRTQ changed to contemporary Christian music as KKCM ("Spirit 102.3"), competing against heritage contemporary Christian station KXOJ-FM. The "Spirit" format leaned towards adult contemporary music, with its playlist consisting of Christian music from the 1980s to then-current titles.

On March 16, 2009, the station abandoned its contemporary Christian format for a simulcast of AM sister station KRMG, with the call sign switched to KRMG-FM, which was previously used on 95.5, now co-owned KWEN, in the 1960s. The move allowed KRMG's news/talk programming to be heard on both the FM and AM dial, and improved KRMG's coverage in parts of Tulsa when the AM station adjust its coverage at night. The Christian format continued to be heard on Cox Digital Cable channel 962.

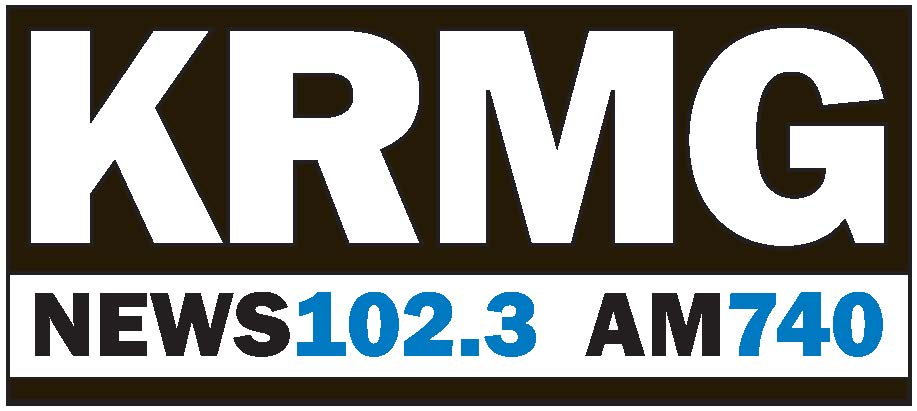
Logo with the former 102.3 frequency until 2026.

On July 7, 2014, KRMG-AM-FM's slogan was changed to "Tulsa's 24-hour News, Weather and Traffic, News 102.3 and AM 740 KRMG". The stations were rebranded on July 15, 2019, using "102.3 KRMG, Tulsa's News and Talk". The AM station is only mentioned occasionally.

On May 19, 2025, Robert Zoellner's Zoellner Media Group entered in an agreement with Cox Media Group to acquire the company's radio stations in Tulsa for $20 million. The sale was completed on August 15, 2025.

On August 3, 2026, Zoellner Media Group announced that KRMG-FM and KRAV-FM would switch frequencies, effective August 31. This move will shift KRMG's News/Talk programming to the 100,000-watt signal currently used by KRAV-FM on 96.5 MHz, improving and increasing KRMG's reach. KRAV will move its music programming to KRMG's current 50,000-watt signal on 102.3 MHz. It was rebranded to "96.5 KRMG Tulsa's News, Weather, & Traffic".

== Programming ==
Weekdays begin with The KRMG Morning News with Skyler Cooper in AM drive time. The KRMG Afternoon News with Hill & Berg in PM drive time. The rest of the weekday schedule consists of nationally syndicated talk shows hosted by Sean Hannity, Erick Erickson, Brian Kilmeade, Red Eye Radio, Jimmy Failla, Markley, Van Camp & Robbins, and Tony Katz.

Weekends feature shows on money, health, real estate, cars, gardening, home repair, law and technology, some of which are paid brokered programming. Weekend hosts include Kim Komando, Bill Handel and James Golden. KRMG-AM-FM has a local news and weather sharing arrangement with former sister station Fox network affiliate KOKI-TV (channel 23), with world and national news supplied by Fox News Radio and ABC News Radio.
