= KYIZ =

- Renton, Washington; United States
- Broadcast area: Seattle metropolitan area
- Frequency: 1620 kHz
- Branding: The Z Twins

Programming
- Format: Urban adult contemporary–talk radio
- Affiliations: Premiere Networks

Ownership
- Owner: Gloria and Christopher Bennett; (Bennett Media Group, LLC)
- Sister stations: KBMS, KRIZ

History
- First air date: 1998; 28 years ago
- Call sign meaning: One of the Z Twins: KRIZ's Bennett, former owner

Technical information
- Licensing authority: FCC
- Facility ID: 86941
- Class: B
- Power: 10,000 watts (day); 1,000 watts (night)
- Transmitter coordinates: 47°26′25″N 122°12′9″W

Links
- Public license information: Public file; LMS
- Webcast: Listen live
- Website: www.ztwins.com

KYIZ (1620 AM) is a radio station broadcasting an urban adult contemporary and talk radio format. Licensed to Renton, Washington, the station serves the Seattle metropolitan area. It is owned by Gloria and Christopher Bennett, through licensee Bennett Media Group, LLC, with studios and offices, shared with KRIZ, located on South Jackson Street in the city's Central District. KYIZ's transmitter site is located in Renton off Wells Avenue South. It broadcasts with 10,000 watts by day, it reduces power at night to 1,000 watts to avoid interfering with other stations on AM 1620. It uses a non-directional antenna at all times.

KYIZ is one of The Z Twins, two radio stations serving the Puget Sound region, most notably the African-American communities of King and Pierce County, Washington.

== Programming ==
KYIZ has served the African-American community throughout its history. On Sundays, Urban Gospel music (courtesy of sister station KRIZ) is heard from 6 a.m.to 6 p.m. Nationally syndicated shows heard on KYIZ include Rickey Smiley Morning Show, Al Sharpton and D.L. Hughley. Sergio Lacour hosts the Weekend Jamz Show on Saturday nights from 7pm-12am simulcasting with Portland's 1480am and 97.5 KBMS RADIO Stations

== History ==
KYIZ began as the "expanded band" twin to station KRIZ. On March 17, 1997, the Federal Communications Commission (FCC) announced that eighty-eight stations had been given permission to move to newly available "Expanded Band" transmitting frequencies, ranging from 1610 to 1700 kHz, with KRIZ in Renton authorized to move from 1420 to 1620 kHz. A construction permit for the expanded band station, also located in Renton, was assigned the callsign KYIZ on February 23, 1998. KYIZ first signed on the air that same year.

The FCC's initial policy was that both the original station and its expanded band counterpart could operate simultaneously for up to five years, after which owners would have to turn in one of the two licenses, depending on whether they preferred the new assignment or elected to remain on the original frequency. However, this deadline has been extended multiple times, and both stations have remained authorized. One restriction is that the FCC has generally required paired original and expanded band stations to remain under common ownership.
