= KKEN =

- Duncan, Oklahoma; United States
- Frequency: 97.1 MHz
- Branding: Kickin' Country

Programming
- Format: Country

Ownership
- Owner: Hilliary Broadcasting Co Inc.
- Sister stations: KJMZ, KACO, KWCO-FM, KFTP, KKRX, KXCA

Technical information
- Licensing authority: FCC
- Facility ID: 17729
- Class: A
- ERP: 6,000 watts
- HAAT: 100 meters (330 ft)
- Transmitter coordinates: 34.51194°N 97.96778°W

Links
- Public license information: Public file; LMS
- Webcast: Listen live
- Website: kickincountry971.com

KKEN (97.1 FM) is a radio station licensed to Duncan, Oklahoma. The station broadcasts a country music format and is owned by Hilliary Broadcasting Co Inc.
