= KRIZ =

Coordinates: 47°26′24.4″N 122°12′13.4″W

- Renton, Washington; United States
- Broadcast area: Seattle
- Frequency: 1420 kHz
- Branding: The Z Twins

Programming
- Format: Urban gospel

Ownership
- Owner: Gloria and Christopher Bennett; (Bennett Media Group, LLC)
- Sister stations: KBMS, KYIZ

History
- First air date: 1982
- Former call signs: KSCR (1979–1984)
- Call sign meaning: Similar to Chris with a Z

Technical information
- Licensing authority: FCC
- Facility ID: 35549
- Class: B
- Power: 1,000 watts day 500 watts night

Links
- Public license information: Public file; LMS
- Webcast: Listen Live
- Website: www.ztwins.com

KRIZ (1420 AM) is a radio station broadcasting an urban gospel format. Licensed to Renton, Washington, United States, it serves the Seattle area. The station is currently owned by Gloria and Christopher Bennett, through licensee Bennett Media Group, LLC. KRIZ shares its studios with KYIZ in the city's Central District east of downtown, and its transmitter is located in Renton.

KRIZ is one of The Z Twins, two radio stations serving the Puget Sound region, most notably the African-American communities of King and Pierce County, Washington. The Z Twins were so named as, at the time, the company only owned two stations, KRIZ and KZIZ (1560 AM). But after KYIZ (1620 AM) signed on, the name stuck, despite now having three stations in the family.

== History ==
KRIZ was preceded on 1420 kHz in Renton by KREN, a station that began operating in 1963, but was deleted by the Federal Communications Commission (FCC) in 1970, due to its failure to fully respond to commission requests for information.

KRIZ originated from a 1977 application to take over the KREN facilities, that was granted in 1979. It was initially given the call sign KSCR, which stood for the slogan "South (King) County Radio", and had an Adult Urban Contemporary music format. On May 11, 1984, the call sign was changed to KRIZ.

=== Expanded Band assignment ===
On March 17, 1997 the FCC announced that eighty-eight stations had been given permission to move to newly available "Expanded Band" transmitting frequencies, ranging from 1610 to 1700 kHz, with KRIZ authorized to move from 1420 to 1620 kHz. A construction permit for the expanded band station, also located in Renton, was assigned the callsign KYIZ on February 23, 1998, and began broadcasting that same year.

The FCC's initial policy was that both the original station and its expanded band counterpart could operate simultaneously for up to five years, after which owners would have to turn in one of the two licenses, depending on whether they preferred the new assignment or elected to remain on the original frequency. However, this deadline has been extended multiple times, and both stations have remained authorized. One restriction is that the FCC has generally required paired original and expanded band stations to remain under common ownership.

In 2016, KZIZ was sold to XL Media and switched to a South Asian format.
