= KJMZ =

Coordinates: 34.592°N 98.549°W

- Cache, Oklahoma; United States
- Broadcast area: Lawton/Fort Sill
- Frequency: 97.9 MHz
- Branding: 97.9 JAMZ

Programming
- Format: Urban contemporary
- Affiliations: Compass Media Networks; United Stations Radio Networks

Ownership
- Owner: Hilliary Broadcasting Co. Inc
- Sister stations: KACO, KWCO-FM, KKEN, KXCA, KFTP, KKRX

History
- Call sign meaning: JaMZ

Technical information
- Licensing authority: FCC
- Facility ID: 35031
- Class: A
- ERP: 6,000 watts
- HAAT: 97 meters

Links
- Public license information: Public file; LMS
- Webcast: Listen Live
- Website: kjmz.com

KJMZ (97.9 FM) is a radio station broadcasting an urban contemporary format. The station is licensed to Cache, Oklahoma, and serves the Lawton area. KJMZ is owned by Hilliary Broadcasting Co. Inc Studios are located on Flower Mound Road in eastern Lawton, and the transmitter is just west of the city.

== History ==
Prior to the change in 1996 KJMZ was KRLG G-98 Adult Contemporary/Top 40 in the mid-1970s and rebranded as 98 FM KRLG featuring Album Orientated Rock from the late 1970s into the early 1980s then rebranded as the New 98 featuring the Adult contemporary format in the late 1980s and early 1990s. The station first signed on as Country KCCO FM (first FM country station in Lawton) in the early 1970s.

The station that would become KJMZ was purchased by Perry Broadcasting in the summer of 1996. At that time, the station was located on the 98.1 frequency. The format was changed to its current R&B and Hip Hop at that time.

In 2006, KJMZ downgraded from a class C1 at 98.1 MHz licensed to Lawton to a class A at 97.9 licensed to Cache. The move was part of a series of FM reallotments across North Texas and Oklahoma to allow KBOC 98.3 Bridgeport to upgrade to cover Dallas/Fort Worth.

On March 5, 2010, KJMZ was taken off the air temporarily after the station's studios were burglarized in the early morning hours. It has since resumed broadcasting.

In December 2018, Mollman Media purchased KJMZ and closed on the sale on April 9, 2019.

In December 2025, Hilliary Broadcasting Co. Inc. purchased KJMZ and closed on the sale on June 10, 2026.

== History of KJMZ ==
For many years the call letters of KJMZ were housed at Dallas-Fort Worth's 100.3 which was also an Churban station now known as "KJKK" Jack FM.
