= Doug Banks =

American DJ

- Born: Calvin Douglas Banks Jr. June 9, 1958; Philadelphia, Pennsylvania, U.S.
- Died: April 11, 2016 (aged 57); Miami, Florida, U.S.
- Spouse(s): 2 former, 1 current
- Children: 4
- Presenting career
- Show: The Doug Banks Radio Show
- Stations: WBMX (Defunct); WVAZ; WGCI-FM (KMJM)
- Network: American Urban Radio Networks
- Time slot: 2-6pm
- Country: United States
- Previous shows: Doug Banks Morning Show, The Ride with Doug and DeDe, Afternoon w/Doug & DeDe,

Calvin Douglas Banks Jr. (June 9, 1958 – April 11, 2016) was an American radio personality and host of The Doug Banks Radio Show.

== Career highlights ==
The Philadelphia-born, Detroit-raised Banks began his radio career broadcasting on his high school's radio station. Local station WDRQ took notice of his talent and offered him a spot as a temporary late-night weekend disc jockey for a country music station. After high school, he successfully turned his temporary trial into a permanent multi-year gig at KDAY in Los Angeles, California. Soon after, in April 1979 he started at KMJM-Majic 108, as "The Unknown DJ"

Banks then moved on to the LA station KFI, which helped to pave the way to a morning show slot in Las Vegas at KLAV. Doug's next two stops were KDIA in Oakland, California, and WBMX (now WVAZ) in Chicago, Illinois. From 1986 to 1995, Banks did nights, mornings, and afternoons for WGCI-FM in Chicago. It was at WGCI where Doug became good friends with Tom Joyner and they became known as "Turntable Brothers". After Tom Joyner started his nationally syndicated show with ABC Radio Networks, Tom chose Doug Banks to be his "fill in" when Tom would take vacations. The affiliates were quickly calling ABC Radio Network to report that listeners were flooding the stations with calls about how much they loved Doug.

Next, in 1995 the ABC Radio Network offered Banks the opportunity to do a nationally syndicated show of his own. Originally, Banks started with an afternoon show from the same studio as the "Tom Joyner Morning Show." This original show had AJ Parker as his sidekick, and Jeff Tyler came from The Tom Joyner Show to become Doug's studio engineer (Jeff stayed with Doug until his death in 2016). In 1997, Banks wanted to move to a morning show instead and the studio across the hall from Joyner's was made ready. The new show, hosted by Banks along with new sidekick DeDe McGuire, rose to become one of the top-rated syndicated urban programs in America. WBLS New York was the flagship station. This era was the high point of Doug's career, and included producers Gary Saunders and Eurro Rice. Other on air talent in this era included Coco Budda, Rickey Smiley, JJ Jackson, and Rudy Rush. His phone producer Marcelina Olan, and Kevin Woodson (the voice of Miss Leonard, Revered Jackson, Minister Farrakhan and many others) were regulars on air as well. The greatest success came with the combination of Doug Banks, Dede McGuire, and Rudy Rush. In January 2008, the show was cancelled, but Banks relaunched the show, this time in the afternoon drive under the new name, The Ride with Doug and DeDe.

Unlike his previous show where Mainstream Urban/Hip Hop/R&B music was played, Banks's new program was aimed at the Urban Adult Contemporary audience, similar to what is played on Joyner's and Steve Harvey's shows. In July 2010, Banks moved his show to American Urban Radio Networks and renamed it The Doug Banks Show. After many years of hosting both the morning show for K104 Dallas and cohosting the syndicated afternoon show with Doug, Dede McGuire resigned to focus exclusively on her own morning show. DeeDee Renee replaced Dede McGuire as cohost. Doug's final broadcast was on Friday April 8, 2016 when he did his show live from an event in Chicago.

Banks also hosted some editions of NASCAR Now on ESPN2. He also made a guest appearance on the sitcom My Wife and Kids as Tom Miller, a friend of Michael Kyle who is tragically killed after being hit by a taxi (offscreen), shortly after he and Michael were together. The death of Tom makes Michael paranoid and overly sensitive about his own life.

== Death ==
Banks died from complications of diabetes and kidney failure on Monday April 11, 2016. Banks is survived by a wife, three daughters and a son.
