= KQIS (AM) =

Radio station in Bethel Heights, Arkansas

- Bethel Heights, Arkansas; United States
- Broadcast area: Northwest Arkansas
- Frequency: 1340 kHz
- Branding: KISS 105.3 FM & 1340 AM

Programming
- Language: English
- Format: Urban contemporary
- Affiliations: Compass Media Networks

Ownership
- Owner: Perry Publishing and Broadcasting; (Perry Broadcasting of Arkansas, Inc.)

History
- First air date: September 10, 1949; 76 years ago
- Former call signs: KBRS (1949–1992); KFMD (2012–2015)

Technical information
- Licensing authority: FCC
- Facility ID: 160838
- Class: C
- Power: 1,000 watts
- Transmitter coordinates: 36°12′43″N 94°07′38″W
- Translator: 105.3 K287AN (Fayetteville)

Links
- Public license information: Public file; LMS
- Webcast: Listen Live
- Website: kissnwa.com

KQIS (1340 kHz) is an AM radio station licensed to serve the community of Bethel Heights, Arkansas. The station is owned by Perry Publishing and Broadcasting, through licensee Perry Broadcasting of Arkansas, Inc. It airs an urban contemporary format.

== History ==
=== KBRS ===
The station signed on the air on September 10, 1949, under the call sign KBRS licensed in Springdale, featuring programming from the ABC Radio Network as well as St. Louis Cardinals baseball and Arkansas Razorbacks college games. The station in its later years ran a MOR format, and later adult contemporary in the mid-1980s. KBRS ceased operations in May 1992 following a license revoke.

=== KFMD & KQIS ===
After two decades of the frequency being off-the-air, the station relaunched under a different license location and assigned the call sign KFMD by the Federal Communications Commission on December 13, 2012.

In February 2013, Hog Radio (the owner at the time) launched the new station as a news/talk radio station, branded as "Freedom 1430".

In November 2015, Hog Radio announced that they would sell the station to Perry Publishing and Broadcasting for $400,000.

The station changed its call sign to KQIS on December 31, 2015. The station then flipped to an urban contemporary radio station.
