= KMOD-FM =

Radio station in Tulsa, Oklahoma

Coordinates: 36.196°N 96.098°W

- Tulsa, Oklahoma; United States
- Broadcast area: Tulsa metropolitan area
- Frequency: 97.5 MHz (HD Radio)
- Branding: 97.5 KMOD

Programming
- Language: English
- Format: Mainstream rock
- Affiliations: Compass Media Networks

Ownership
- Owner: iHeartMedia; (iHM Licenses, LLC)
- Sister stations: KAKC; KIZS; KTBT; KTBZ; KTGX

History
- First air date: October 10, 1959
- Former call signs: KOCW (1959–1968); KMOD (1968–1980)
- Call sign meaning: "Modern"

Technical information
- Licensing authority: FCC
- Facility ID: 11957
- Class: C
- ERP: 100,000 watts
- HAAT: 453 meters (1,486 ft)

Links
- Public license information: Public file; LMS
- Webcast: Listen live (via iHeartRadio)
- Website: kmod.iheart.com

KMOD-FM (97.5 MHz) is a commercial radio station in Tulsa, Oklahoma, United States, owned by iHeartMedia. It airs a mainstream rock radio format. The station's studios and offices are at the Tulsa Events Center on South Yale Avenue in Southeast Tulsa.

KMOD-FM is a Class C station. It has an effective radiated power (ERP) of 100,000 watts, the maximum for most FM stations. The transmitter tower is along Oklahoma State Highway 97 on the Osage Reservation in Sand Springs. KMOD-FM broadcasts in the HD Radio digital format. Its HD2 subchannel formerly played alternative rock. The HD2 subchannel has since been turned off.

== History ==
The station signed on the air on October 10, 1959. Its original call sign was KOCW and it was owned by Grayhill, Inc. It was a rare stand-alone FM station in an era when few people owned FM receivers. Most FM stations at that time were co-owned with an AM or TV station. In 1960, Claude Hill bought out partner Meredith Gray. The station had an easy listening format, known as "Good Music."

KOCW was sold to Dawson Communications/Turnpike Broadcasting Corporation in 1968 and became KMOD on April 15 of that year. It had a progressive rock format. The call letters represented the word "modern." Clear Channel Communications, the forerunner to today's iHeartMedia, acquired the station in 1973 out of bankruptcy. It became the sister station to 1300 KXXO (now KAKC).

KMOD is known as the nearly 30-year home of disc jockeys Brent Douglas and Phil Stone, who hosted morning drive time. The pair originated the character Roy D. Mercer, the notorious and popular prank caller who regularly threatened to "open a can of whup-ass" on the person he called for some fabricated wrong the person supposedly had done. Eventually the person might find out the call was a prank. Stone and Douglas' show was ended due to the latter's refusal to sign a new contract. Stone died in 2012.

Actress Jeanne Tripplehorn was also a DJ at KMOD in the 1980s. She used the air name Jeanne Summers.
