= KRMG (AM) =

Radio station in Tulsa, Oklahoma

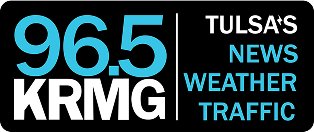
- Tulsa, Oklahoma; United States
- Broadcast area: Tulsa metropolitan area
- Frequency: 740 kHz
- Branding: 96.5 KRMG Tulsa's News, Weather, & Traffic

Programming
- Format: News/talk
- Affiliations: ABC News Radio; Compass Media Networks; Fox News Radio; Premiere Networks; Red Apple Media; Westwood One

Ownership
- Owner: Zoellner Media Group LLC
- Sister stations: KRHZ; KRAV-FM; KRMG-FM; KWEN

History
- First air date: December 31, 1949
- Call sign meaning: founding owners Robert Kerr and Dean McGee

Technical information
- Licensing authority: FCC
- Facility ID: 48729
- Class: B
- Power: 50,000 watts day 25,000 watts night
- Transmitter coordinates: 36°04′50.3″N 96°17′10″W
- Repeater: 96.5 KRMG-FM (Sand Springs)

Links
- Public license information: Public file; LMS
- Webcast: Listen live Listen live (via Audacy)
- Website: www.krmg.com

KRMG (740 kHz) is a commercial radio station in Tulsa, Oklahoma, United States. The station is owned by Zoellner Media Group LLC and airs a news/talk radio format, simulcast with co-owned 96.5 KRMG-FM. The studios and offices are on South Memorial Drive near Interstate 44 in Tulsa.

KRMG's transmitter is on Tower Road in Sand Springs, Oklahoma. KRMG broadcasts at 50,000 watts by day, the maximum power permitted for American AM stations. But it drops its power to 25,000 watts at night and uses a directional antenna at all times to protect other stations on AM 740. Three towers are used during the day, providing at least secondary coverage to almost all of Oklahoma, as well as portions of Arkansas, Missouri, Kansas and Texas. At night, power is fed to a six-tower array to protect Class A CFZM Toronto, concentrating the signal in the Tulsa and Oklahoma City areas. KRMG-AM-FM are also heard on Channel 1980 through Cox's digital cable service. The AM station is the Oklahoma primary entry point for the Emergency Alert System.

== Programming ==
Weekdays begin with The KRMG Morning News with Skyler Cooper. The KRMG Afternoon News with Hill & Berg in PM drive time. The rest of the weekday schedule is made up of nationally syndicated talk shows hosted by Sean Hannity, Erick Erickson, Brian Kilmeade, Red Eye Radio, Jimmy Failla, Tony Katz and Markley, Van Camp & Robbins.

Weekends feature shows on money, health, real estate, cars, gardening, home repair, law and technology, some of which are paid brokered programming. Weekend hosts include Kim Komando, Bill Handel and James Golden. KRMG-AM-FM have a local news and weather sharing arrangement with former sister station Fox network affiliate KOKI-TV (channel 23), with world and national news supplied by ABC News Radio.

== History ==
On December 31, 1949, KRMG first signed on. It was founded by Kerr-McGee Oil Company partners Robert S. Kerr and Dean McGee. The call sign was chosen to take two letters from the names of the founding owners, KerR and McGee. Kerr, at the time a U. S. Senator, wanted a station that would provide a strong signal to Oklahoma City as well as Tulsa. At the same time, KRMG had to conform its signal to protect co-channel stations to the north and south. The station was powered at 50,000 watts in the daytime to achieve the desired footprint. Power was originally reduced to 10,000 watts at night. Six towers were constructed to create a directional pattern at night while hitting Oklahoma City as well as Tulsa.

In 1957, KRMG was acquired by the Meredith Corporation, a publishing and broadcasting company. It was a CBS Radio Network affiliate. KRMG aired a full service middle of the road format from the 1950s to the early 70s.

In 1961, KRMG was acquired by Swanco Broadcasting. That same year, it added an FM sister station, KRMG-FM at 95.5 MHz. At first it simulcast AM 740 but later switched to beautiful music as KWEN, and in 1982 it flipped to country music. KWEN changed ownership over the years but today is again co-owned with KRMG.

KRMG is credited with the development of Tulsa's River Parks. The station first hosted the "Great Raft Race" in 1973. It was a floating race down the Arkansas River from Sand Springs to Tulsa, attracting large crowds to the river banks. The River Parks Authority was formed in 1974 to develop the area.

In the late 1970s, KRMG moved to a full service adult contemporary format. In the 1980s, as music listening began to shift from AM to FM, KRMG added talk shows at night from NBC Talknet. By the 1990s, the station dropped music altogether and made the transition to the current news/talk format.

Cox Media acquired KRMG and KWEN in 1997. In 2009, a new KRMG-FM was created at 102.3 MHz. That station's Christian contemporary music format was dropped to allow it to simulcast KRMG's talk programming, giving Tulsa radio listeners the choice of hearing KRMG on AM or FM. It also improved KRMG's nighttime coverage in portions of Tulsa.

On July 7, 2014, KRMG-AM-FM's slogan changed to "Tulsa's 24-hour News, Weather and Traffic, News 102.3 and AM 740 KRMG." The stations changed their positioning again on July 15, 2019, using "102.3 KRMG, Tulsa's News and Talk." The AM station is only mentioned occasionally.

On May 19, 2025, Dr. Robert Zoellner's Zoellner Media Group entered in an agreement with Cox Media Group to acquire the company's radio cluster in Tulsa for $20 million. The sale was completed on August 15, 2025.

== Former hosts ==
Former KRMG hosts include John Erling, Ann Williams, Dianna Proffitt, Dick Andert, Jerry Vaughn, Watson Jelks, Johnny Martin, Trey Callaway, Rob Hough, and Wes Minter. In the KRMG newsroom, ABC's Bob Brown and CNN's Bob Losure once served as reporters. Frank Powers is now in Jacksonville, Florida. Rand LaVonn was news director in the late 1980s. He is now in Dallas where he volunteered as President of PRSA Dallas in 2013 and President of the Press Club of Dallas from 2000 to 2001. LaVonn was a communications manager for electric and gas utilities in the Dallas region. John Durkee served as news director for 18-years prior to joining the City of Tulsa as Communication Director and then moving on to Tulsa's NPR affiliate KWGS. Union Public Schools Public Relations Director Gretchen Haas was an anchor and reporter. Richard Dowdell was a reporter and anchor for KRMG News for over 30 years.
