= KTBZ (AM) =

Radio station in Tulsa, Oklahoma

- Tulsa, Oklahoma; United States
- Broadcast area: Tulsa metropolitan area
- Frequency: 1430 kHz
- Branding: 1430 the Buzz

Programming
- Format: Sports
- Affiliations: Fox Sports Radio

Ownership
- Owner: iHeartMedia; (iHM Licenses, LLC)
- Sister stations: KAKC; KIZS; KMOD-FM; KTBT; KTGX

History
- First air date: 1923 (in Chickasha as KFGD); January 22, 1934 (in Tulsa as KTUL)
- Former call signs: KFGD (1923–1925); KOCW (1925–1933); KTUL (1933–1961); KELI (1961–1986); KVLT (1986); KSKS (1986–1990); KQLL (1990–2001)
- Call sign meaning: "The Buzz"

Technical information
- Licensing authority: FCC
- Facility ID: 68293
- Class: B
- Power: 25,000 watts day; 5,000 watts night
- Transmitter coordinates: 36°14′12.3″N 95°57′20″W

Links
- Public license information: Public file; LMS
- Webcast: Listen live (via iHeartRadio)
- Website: buzztulsa.iheart.com

KTBZ (1430 kHz, "1430 the Buzz") is a commercial AM radio station in Tulsa, Oklahoma, United States. It airs a sports radio format as an affiliate of Fox Sports Radio and is owned by iHeartMedia, with the license held by iHM Licenses, LLC. KTBZ's studios are at the Tulsa Event Center, on Yale Avenue in Southeast Tulsa.

By day, KTBZ transmits with 25,000 watts. At night, to protect other stations on 1430 kHz from interference, it reduces power to 5,000 watts. It uses a directional antenna with a three-tower array. The transmitter site is on East 56th Street North at North Lewis Avenue in Turley.

== History ==
The station has traditionally traced its history to January 22, 1934, the date when it began broadcasting from Tulsa. However, Federal Communications Commission (FCC) records list the station's first license date as April 19, 1923, tracing its origin to the original license, issued as KFGD to the Chickasha Radio & Electric Co. in Chickasha, Oklahoma. The KFGD call sign was randomly assigned from an alphabetic roster of available call letters. The next year the station was purchased by the Oklahoma College for Women, and in 1925 the call sign was changed to KOCW. In 1932 the station was sold, and moved beginning the next year to Tulsa as KTUL.

It was heard on 1400 kHz starting in 1929, and moved to 1430 kHz with the 1941 implementation of the North American Regional Broadcasting Agreement (NARBA). KTUL was Tulsa's second radio station, after KVOO.

=== CBS Radio and MOR ===
KTUL was an affiliate of the CBS Radio Network, and carried CBS's schedule of dramas, comedies, news, sports, soap operas, game shows and big band broadcasts during the "Golden Age of Radio". One of its early local stars, with a regular live music program, was a young teen-aged Patti Page.

In the 1950s, network programming moved from radio to television, so KTUL switched to a full service, middle of the road (MOR) format of popular adult music, news and sports.

=== Top 40 KELi ===
In the fall of 1961, the station was bought by new owners. It switched to a Top 40 hits format and the callsign was changed to KELI (with a little "i" in the station logo).

During the 1960s, KELI became famous for having a disc jockey and news staff all with the last name of "Kelly". The station broadcast from the "Satellite Studios" in the middle of the Tulsa State Fairgrounds until the station moved in 1982. The station had studio tours and did many promotions during the Tulsa State Fair. KELI's Top 40 format lasted for 20 years, outlasting rival KAKC, which switched to MOR and adult standards in 1979.

Since the early 1980s, 1430 has aired a talk radio format, contemporary hits (as the short-lived "14-K / 92-K" in 1983 and 1984), oldies, adult contemporary and classic country.

=== The Buzz ===
Previous logo

The station was assigned the callsign KTBZ by the Federal Communications Commission on June 5, 2001. It flipped to a sports talk station as "AM 1430 The Buzz". Originally it was a Fox Sports Radio affiliate. It carries live games from the Oklahoma Sooners, Tulsa Drillers and the Dallas Cowboys. In Tulsa, co-owned AM 1430 and AM 1300 had combined to form the Buzz Sports Network.

In 2021, KFAQ switched to a sports format, as KTSB "The Blitz". It took the Fox Sports Radio affiliation, with KTBZ switching to CBS Sports Radio. Co-owned KAKC flipped to talk radio programming as "The Patriot".

In 2024, KTSB switched to a news format as KOTV "News on 6 Now". This allowed KTBZ to switch from the Infinity Sports Network affiliation back to Fox Sports Radio.
