= KAKS =

Radio station in Goshen, Arkansas, United States

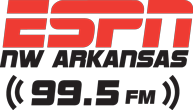
- Goshen, Arkansas; United States
- Broadcast area: Fayetteville (Northwest Arkansas)
- Frequency: 99.5 MHz
- Branding: ESPN Radio 99.5

Programming
- Format: Sports
- Affiliations: ESPN Radio

Ownership
- Owner: Frank Pearson; (Pearson Broadcasting of Goshen, Inc.)
- Sister stations: KXRD, KBVA, KXVB, KFFK, KREB

History
- First air date: 1989 (as KFAY-FM)
- Former call signs: KRRA (1983–1988); KFAY-FM (1988–1993); KREB (1993–1997); KREB-FM (1997–2005)
- Call sign meaning: K ArKanSas

Technical information
- Licensing authority: FCC
- Facility ID: 69858
- Class: A
- ERP: 3,100 watts
- HAAT: 140 meters
- Transmitter coordinates: 36°12′19.6″N 94°06′06.9″W
- Translator: (95.3 MHz) K237GR (Johnson)

Links
- Public license information: Public file; LMS
- Webcast: Listen Live
- Website: hitthatline.com

KAKS (99.5 FM) is a radio station broadcasting a sports format. Licensed to Goshen, Arkansas, United States, it serves the Fayetteville (Northwest Arkansas) area. The station is currently owned by Frank Pearson, through licensee Pearson Broadcasting of Goshen, Inc. In 2015 KAKS switched affiliations from Yahoo! Sports Radio to ESPN Radio and re-branded as "ESPN Radio 99.5".

KAKS rebroadcasts on FM translator K287AN licensed to Fayetteville, Arkansas, and simulcasts on sister station KUOA in Siloam Springs, Arkansas.

On August 14, 2010, KAKS on-air personality Renee Gork was fired after a confrontation with Coach Bobby Petrino. Petrino refused to answer questions posed by Gork while she donned a University of Florida Gators hat. Gork claimed that she grabbed the hat from her trunk during a rainstorm, and tried to cover the hat with tape to disguise the logo. According to Gork, she was told by her bosses that they "had her back" and would defend her reasoning to the administration at the University of Arkansas and Coach Petrino. KAKS relieved Gork of her duties on August 16, 2010.
