= Mike Kenney =

American politician

Member of the Arkansas House of Representatives from the 97th district
- In office January 13, 2003 – January 12, 2009
- Preceded by: John Eason
- Succeeded by: Jonathan Barnett

Personal details
- Born: November 27, 1960 Evanston, Illinois
- Died: December 30, 2019 (aged 59) Siloam Springs, Arkansas
- Party: Republican

Mike Kenney (November 27, 1960 – December 30, 2019) was an American politician who served in the Arkansas House of Representatives from the 97th district from 2003 to 2009.

He died on December 30, 2019, in Siloam Springs, Arkansas at age 59.
