= George E. Nowotny =

American politician (1932–2026)

George Edward Nowotny, Jr.

Arkansas State Representative from Sebastian County
- In office January 1, 1967 – December 31, 1972

Personal details
- Born: October 18, 1932 Tulsa, Oklahoma, U.S.
- Died: April 19, 2026 (aged 93)
- Party: Republican
- Spouse(s): (1) Lura Duff Elliston (divorced) (2) Dena Mae Logan Nowotny
- Children: Edward Duff Nowotny Addison D. Nowotny George Nowotny, III
- Education: University of Texas at Austin
- Occupation: Geologist; Banker; Real estate businessman

George Edward Nowotny, Jr. (October 18, 1932 – April 19, 2026), was a businessman from Tulsa, Oklahoma, who was a three-term Republican state representative from Fort Smith, Arkansas. Initially elected in 1966 with Winthrop Rockefeller, the first Republican governor of Arkansas since the Reconstruction era, Nowotny left politics in 1972, when he declined to seek a fourth term as a legislator.

== Background ==
Nowotny was the son of Margaret Augusta Voigt and George Nowotny, Sr., who are interred at Sunset Memorial Park in San Antonio, Texas. The senior Nowotny was an insurance agent in New Braunfels in Central Texas north of San Antonio. Nowotny graduated in 1955 with a Bachelor of Science degree in geology from the University of Texas at Austin. Nowotny worked in Fort Smith as a partner with Barton and Nowotny Consulting Geologists.

Nowotny was first married to the former Lura Duff (born 1933), now Lura Elliston, who still resides in Fort Smith. The couple has three sons, Edward Duff Nowotny, a businessman in Austin, Texas; Addison D. Nowotny, and George "Tres" Nowotny, III (born 1957), an attorney from La Cañada Flintridge in suburban Los Angeles, California.

== Political life ==
In 1967, Speaker of the Arkansas House of Representatives Sterling R. Cockrill of the capital city of Little Rock appointed Nowotny the first ever Minority Leader of the state House because Nowotny's name was the first alphabetically among the three Republican House members. In addition, Rockefeller chose Nowotny as the "Governor's Representative" on the Arkansas Legislative Council.

During his first term, Nowotny's other Republican colleagues were Danny L. Patrick, then a young educator from Madison County, and Jim Sheets, an administrator at John Brown University in Siloam Springs in Benton County.

Nowotny described his political agenda as "simply good government." Nowotny led efforts to establish what subsequently became the Booneville Human Development Center, a facility for disabled adults located in Booneville in Logan County. The home had previously been the Arkansas State Tuberculosis Sanatorium, which closed in 1973.

Nowotny and Charles T. Bernard, the Republican who ran against U.S. Senator J. William Fulbright in 1968, considered running for governor as conservatives and stressed their differences with Rockefeller on a few issues. In 1970, Nowotny told Rockefeller that he could not support an increase or adjustments in the state sales tax, which Rockefeller had requested along with hikes in the personal state income tax. On March 26, 1970, Nowotny announced his candidacy for governor but soon withdrew when Rockefeller declared his intention to run again.

Nowotny was instead elected to his third term in the state House. Because he had endorsed candidate-imposed term limits, Nowotny did not pursue a fourth term in the legislature in 1972.

Nowotny was a delegate to the 1972 Republican National Convention and then managed the Arkansas campaign for U.S. President Richard M. Nixon, the first Republican to win the state's electoral votes since 1876.

== Nowotny in retrospect ==
For two years after his legislative service, Nowotny directed a Ford Foundation project of the National Legislative Leadership Conference designed to upgrade the operations of state legislatures. The survey area did not encompass Arkansas but six other states, including neighboring Louisiana, which in 1974 adopted a new state constitution to streamline operations and to strengthen the legislature from domination by the governor. Thereafter, Nowotny withdrew from politics though he remains a registered Republican in Oklahoma. In 1970, Arkansas legislative pay was $100 per month plus $20 per diem for regular sessions and $6 per diem in special sessions. Regular sessions met for ninety days every odd year.

Ernest Clifton Dumas of Little Rock, a journalist with the former Arkansas Gazette newspaper, recalls Nowotny from the hindsight of nearly four decades as "a bright guy, effective legislator, and not extremely partisan." Dumas' colleague, Douglas Smith, describes Nowotny as "a good legislator, progressive, and outspoken ... The Democrats didn't like him though; they thought he was too pushy." Smith recalls the Rockefeller legislators overall as having been more liberal in political philosophy than subsequent Arkansas GOP lawmakers, who inched toward majority status by the second decade of the 21st century.

After his divorce from his first wife, Lura, Nowotny wed the former Dena Logan Dills (born c. 1927), a widow from Oklahoma. Since 1974, with the exception of five years in California, he and Dena have resided in Tulsa, In 1997, he retired from banking and real estate.

Nowotny died on April 19, 2026.
