= Jonathan Barnett (politician) =

American businessman and politician

Jonathan D. Barnett

Member of the Arkansas House of Representatives from the 97th district
- In office January 2009 – January 2013
- Preceded by: Mike Kenney
- Succeeded by: Bob Ballinger

Member of the Arkansas House of Representatives from the 87th district
- In office January 2013 – January 2015
- Preceded by: Justin Harris
- Succeeded by: Robin Lundstrum

Personal details
- Born: 1955 (age 70–71)
- Party: Republican
- Spouse: Cristy Barnett
- Children: Three children
- Education: John Brown University (B.S. B.A.)
- Occupation: Owner, Jonathan Barnett Enterprises, Inc.

Jonathan D. Barnett (born 1955) is a businessman and Republican politician from Siloam Springs, Arkansas, who served in the Arkansas House of Representatives from 2009 until he was term-limited in 2015. Barnett represented District 97 from 2009 to 2013, and served as the House Assistant Speaker Pro Tempore. Following redistricting, Barnett represented District 87 for his last term from 2013 to 2015. Barnett also served on the Arkansas State Highway Commission from 1999 to 2009. Barnett is the owner of Jonathan Barnett Enterprises, Inc., a general contracting and real estate company.

| Preceded by Mike Kennedy | Arkansas State Representative for District 97 (now Carroll, Madison, and Washington counties); 2011–2013 | Succeeded by Bob Ballinger |
| Preceded by Justin Harris (moved to District 81) | Arkansas State Representative for District 87 (Benton and Washington County); 2013–2015 | Succeeded by Robin Lundstrum |
