= Fred Bartell House =

Historic house in Arkansas, United States

- U.S. National Register of Historic Places
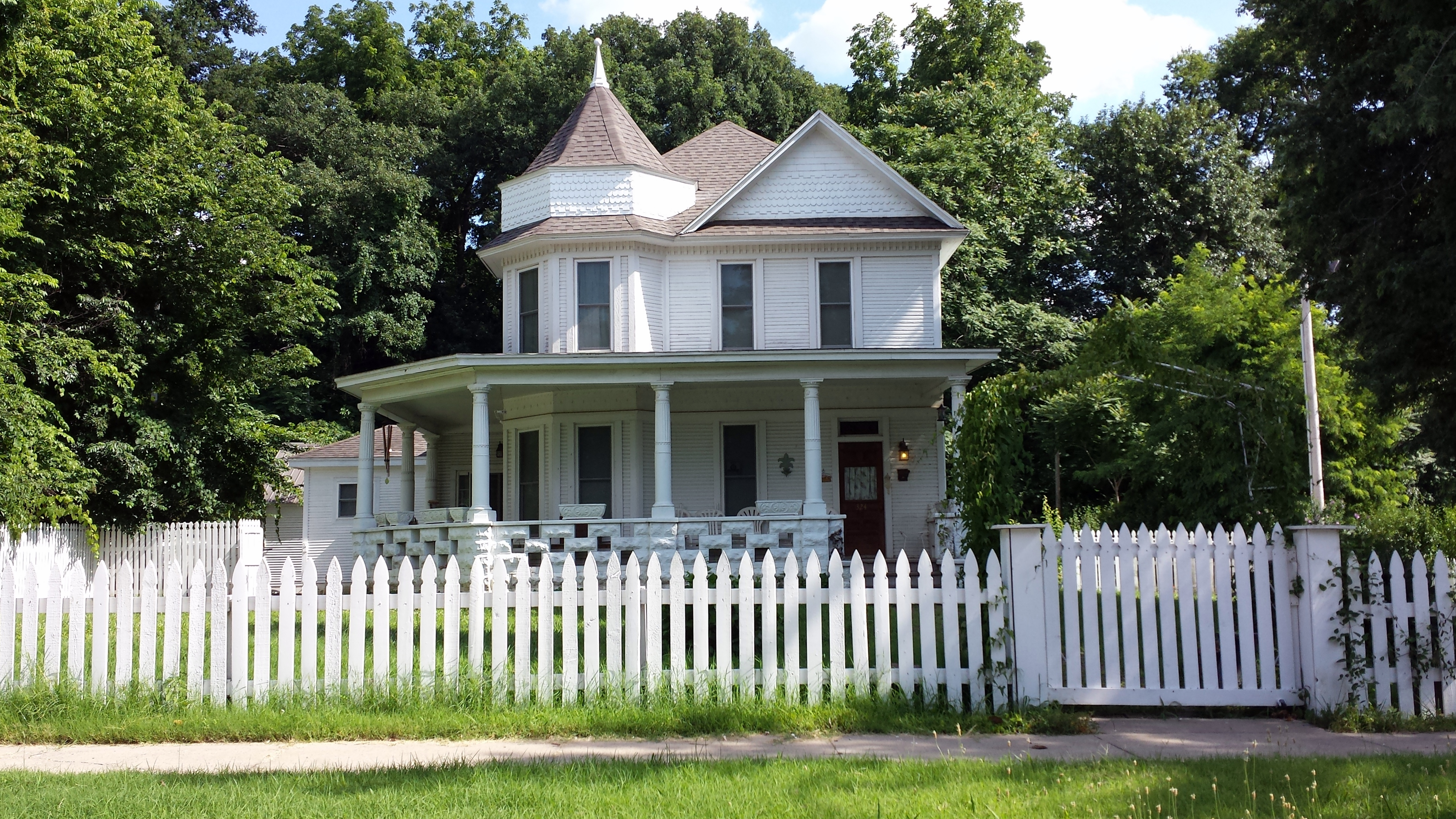

- Location within Arkansas Location within the United States
- Location: 324 E. Twin Springs St., Siloam Springs, Arkansas
- Coordinates: 36°10′57″N 94°32′19″W
- Area: less than one acre
- Built: 1900
- Architectural style: Classical Revival, Queen Anne
- MPS: Benton County MRA
- NRHP reference No.: 87002429
- Added to NRHP: January 28, 1988

The Fred Bartell House is a historic house at 324 East Twin Springs Street in Siloam Springs, Arkansas. Built c. 1900, it is a 2 1/2-story wood-frame structure, with asymmetrical massing typical of the Queen Anne style. It has a low octagonal turret at the front left, and a porch, supported by Tuscan columns mounted on a lattice of concrete blocks that form a low balustrade. The house is clad in novelty siding.

The house was listed on the National Register of Historic Places in 1988.

== See also ==
- National Register of Historic Places listings in Benton County, Arkansas
