= Carl's Addition Historic District =

Historic district in Arkansas, United States

- U.S. National Register of Historic Places
- U.S. Historic district
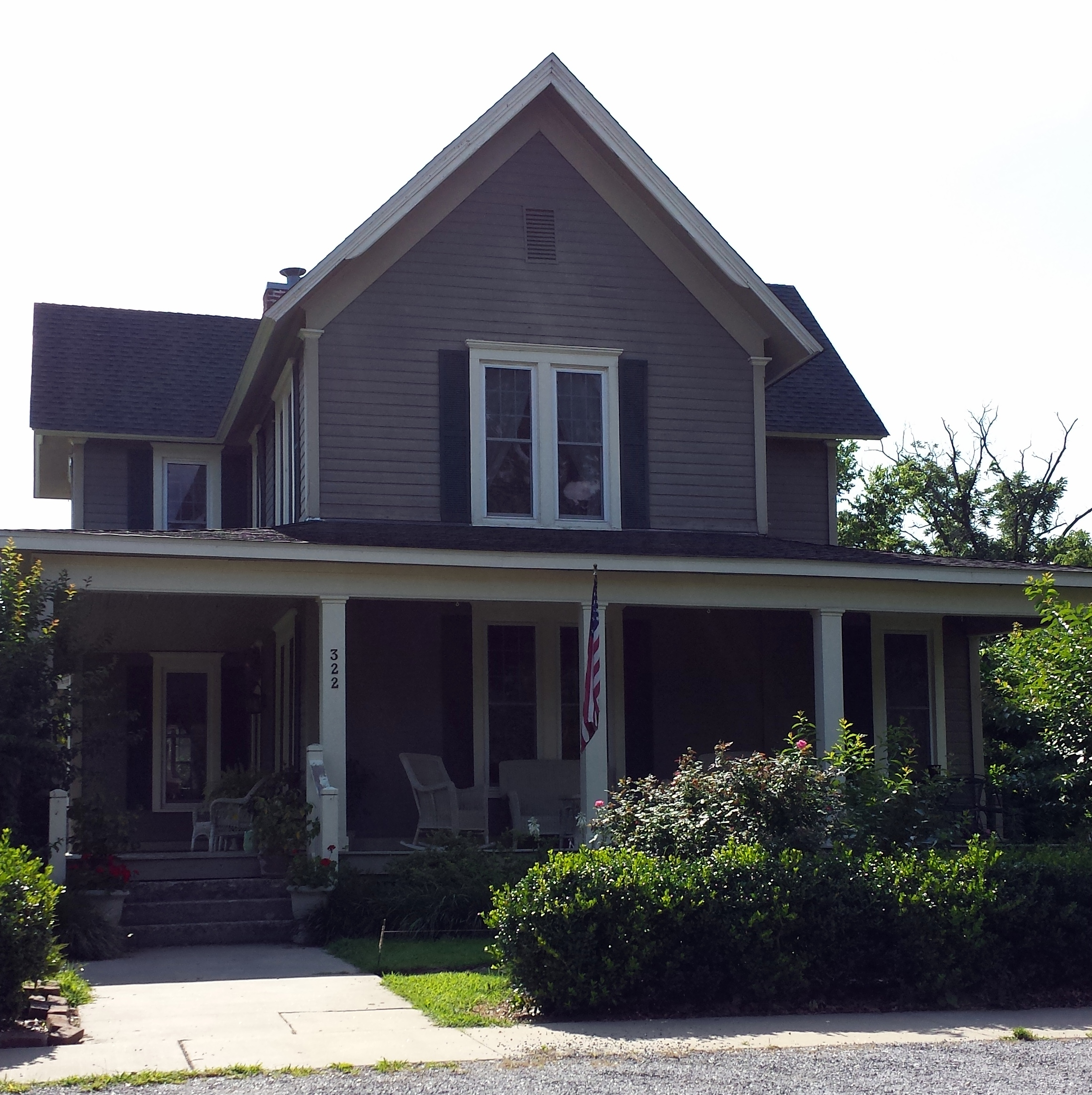
- 322 South Wright Street

- Location within Arkansas Location within the United States
- Location: Along S. College, W. Alpine, and S. Wright Sts., Bounded by Sager Cr. and W. Twin Springs Ave., Siloam Springs, Arkansas
- Area: 15 acres (6.1 ha)
- Architectural style: Queen Anne, Colonial Revival, Bungalow/craftsman
- MPS: Benton County MRA
- NRHP reference No.: 97000791
- Added to NRHP: July 17, 1997

The Carl's Addition Historic District is a predominantly residential historic district in Siloam Springs, Arkansas. The area was developed between about 1895 and 1945, a period of growth brought about by the arrival of the railroad. It contains a concentration of Queen Anne and Craftsman style houses, although other popular revival styles are also represented to some degree. The district extends along South Wright Street between Twin Springs and Alpine Streets, and for single blocks along West Alpine and South College Streets.

The district was listed on the National Register of Historic Places in 1997.

== See also ==
- National Register of Historic Places listings in Benton County, Arkansas
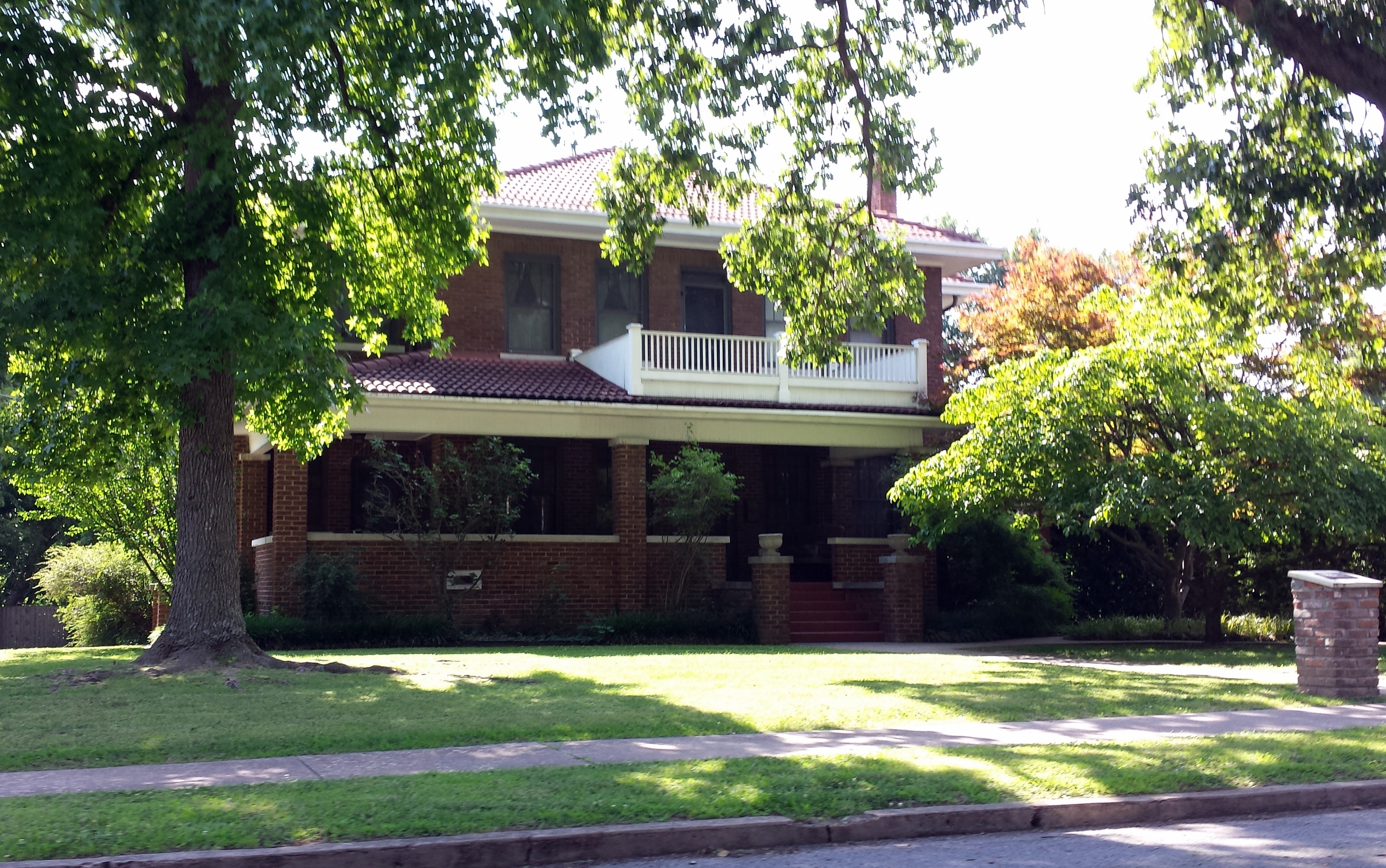
Maxwell St House 2014

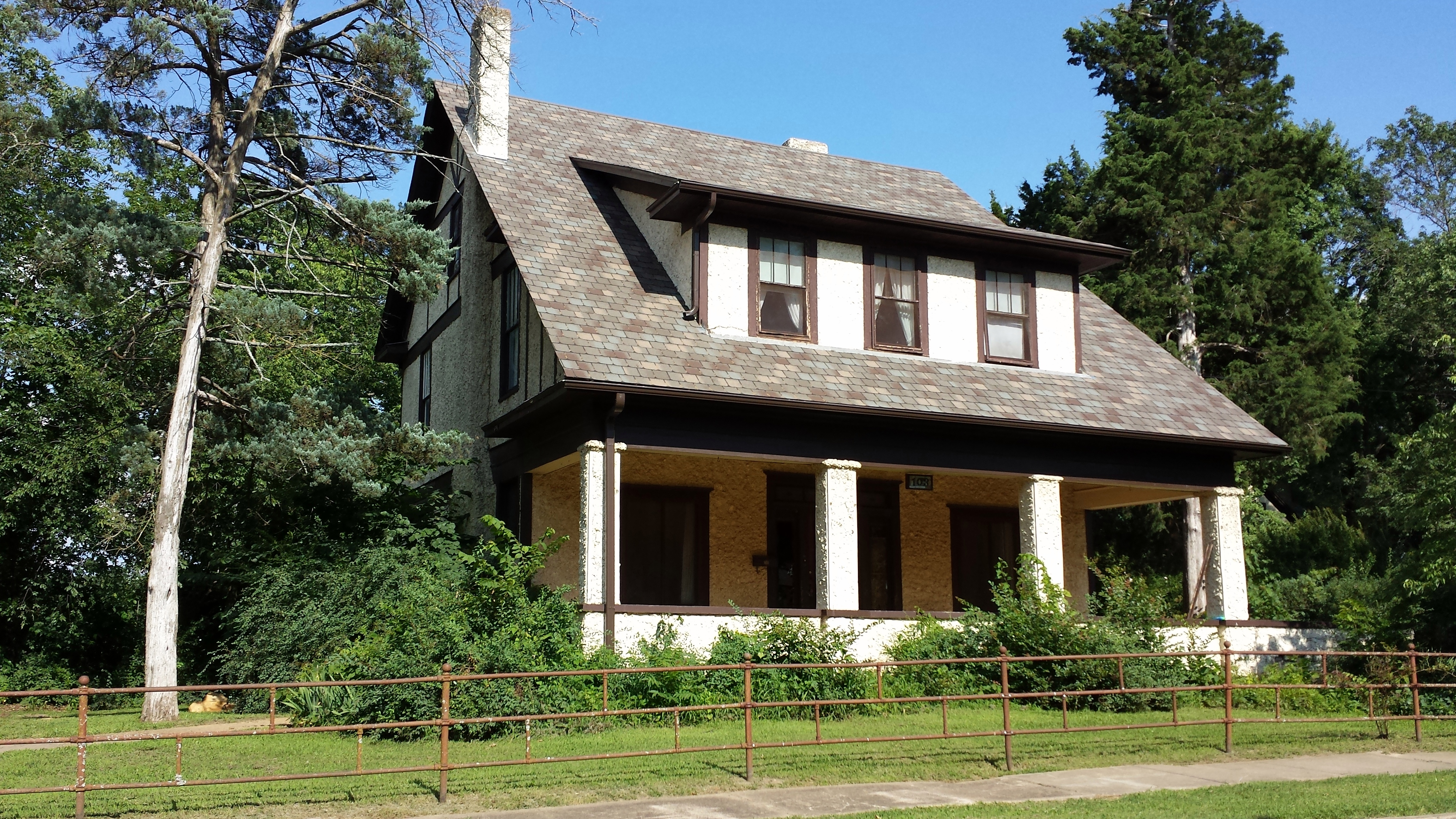
Duckworth-Williams House 2014

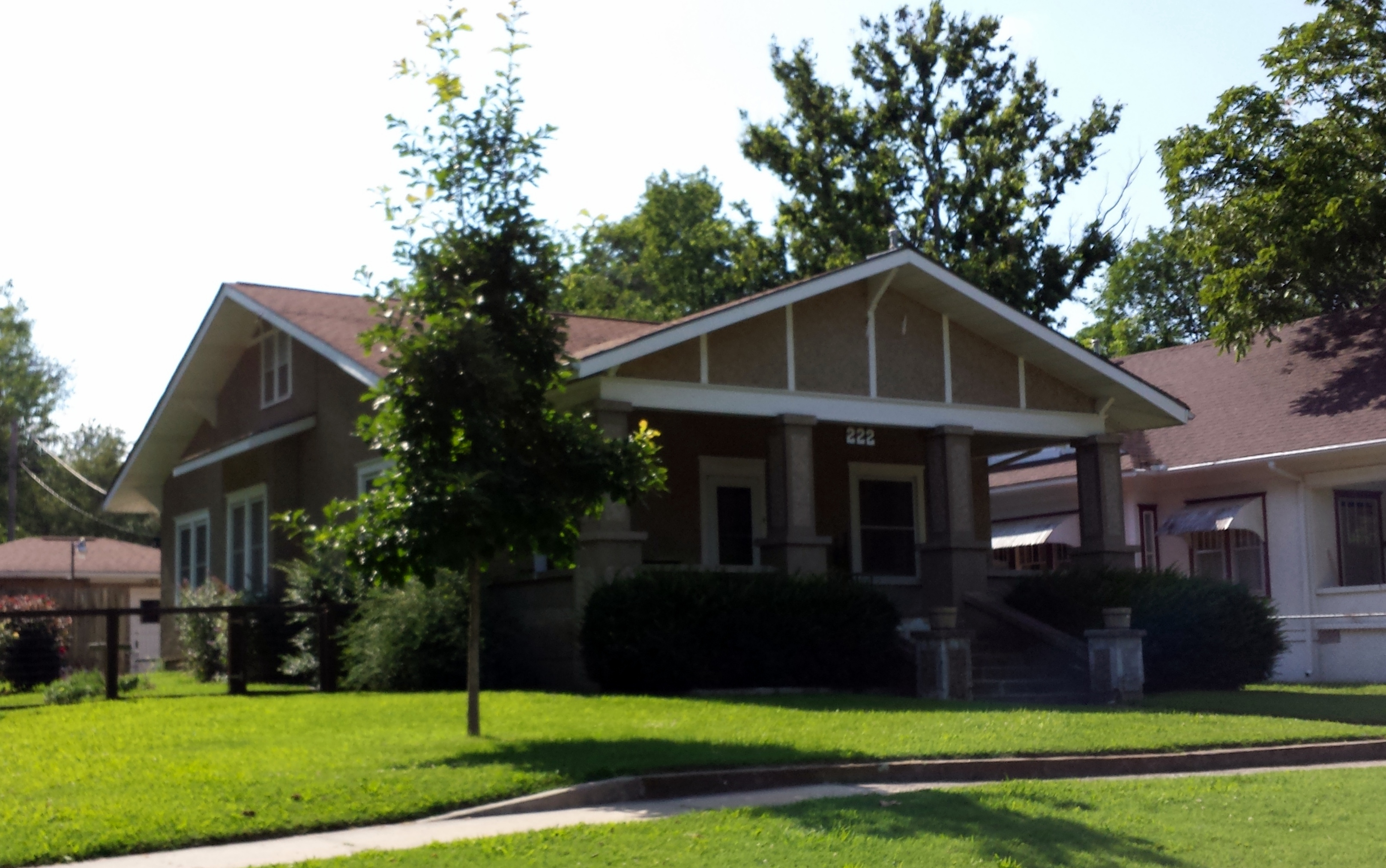
Quell House 2014
