= KUOA =

- Siloam Springs, Arkansas; United States
- Broadcast area: Northwest Arkansas
- Frequency: 1290 kHz
- Branding: La Maxxima 103.1 FM & 1290 AM

Programming
- Format: Regional Mexican

Ownership
- Owner: Jesus Gabriel Hernandez; (Maxx Media Radio, LLC)

History
- First air date: 1923
- Former call signs: KFMQ (1923-1926)
- Call sign meaning: K University Of Arkansas

Technical information
- Licensing authority: FCC
- Facility ID: 35729
- Class: D
- Power: 5,000 watts day 31 watts night
- Transmitter coordinates: 36°11′28″N 94°33′58″W
- Translator: 103.1 K276CO (Fayetteville)

Links
- Public license information: Public file; LMS
- Webcast: Listen Live
- Website: lamaxxima.com

KUOA (1290 AM) is a commercial radio station licensed to Siloam Springs, Arkansas. It serves Northwest Arkansas, including Fayetteville and Bentonville. KUOA airs a Regional Mexican format and is owned by Jesus Gabriel Hernandez, through licensee Maxx Media Radio, LLC. The station is known as "La Maxxima 103.1 FM & 1290 AM."

KUOA has a daytime power of 5,000 watts. But to protect other stations on AM 1290, it greatly reduces power at night to 31 watts. It uses a non-directional antenna. The transmitter is off West University Street in Siloam Springs, near the Arkansas-Oklahoma border. Programming is also heard on FM translator 103.1 K276CO in Fayetteville.

== History ==
The station was first licensed, as KFMQ, on December 4, 1923, to the University of Arkansas in Fayetteville. The original call letters were randomly assigned from an alphabetical list of available call signs, and was changed to KUOA in 1926.

It was licensed as a daytimer, required to go off at sunset, when AM band radio waves travel farther. The station moved to AM 1290 with the implementation in 1941 of the North American Regional Broadcasting Agreement (NARBA).

The station was acquired by John Brown University in 1935. It was run as a Christian radio station, carrying religious programs and Southern Gospel music. In 1947, it added an FM station at 105.7, using the call sign KUOA-FM. The two stations were network affiliates of the Mutual Broadcasting System. The FM station was later sold to separate owners and is now KMCK-FM, a Top 40 station, while John Brown University now owns and broadcasts from KLRC.

In 2005, the university sold the AM radio station to longtime Northwest Arkansas broadcaster Dewey Johnson. But he retired due to health problems. The station was sold later that year to Galen O. Gilbert, a former JBU student who had owned radio stations in Missouri, Oklahoma, and Texas. Gilbert started a classic country format on the station.

The station was sold in August 2008 to longtime Arkansas broadcaster Jay Bunyard, and became an all-sports radio station known as "The Hog". Paired with a brand new Fayetteville-licensed FM translator at 105.3 FM, the radio station aired live and local programming throughout the day, and focused mainly on Arkansas Razorbacks athletics.

In 2010, Bunyard purchased FM 99.5 KAKS, and The Hog was simulcast on its 25,000 watt signal. On December 13, 2012, KUOA split from its simulcast with sports-formatted KAKS 99.5 FM and changed to a talk radio format, branded as "AM 1290 The Mouth".

On January 1, 2015, the talk programming was discontinued. KUOA resumed simulcasting sports-formatted KAKS 99.5 FM.

KUOA began airing its programming on FM translator K249EV 97.7 MHz, licensed to Johnson, Arkansas. In November 2016, the translator moved its frequency to 95.3 FM, as K237GR.

Hog Radio sold KUOA to Jesus Gabriel Hernandez's Maxx Media Radio, LLC for $50,000 effective April 30, 2021.

On September 16, 2022, KUOA flipped to Regional Mexican as "La Maxxima 1290 AM". It rebranded as "La Maxxima 103.3 FM & 1290 AM" on June 8, 2023 with the addition of translator 103.1 FM K276CO in Fayetteville.
