= Jim Sheets =

American businessman and politician (1931–2020)

James Lee "Jim" Sheets

Arkansas State Representative for Benton County
- In office January 1, 1967 – December 31, 1968
- Succeeded by: Preston Bynum

Personal details
- Born: March 29, 1931 Arkansas City, Cowley County; Kansas, U.S.
- Died: March 1, 2020 (aged 88)
- Party: Republican
- Spouse: Martha Hamlin Sheets (married 1954)
- Children: Four adopted children: Kimberly S. Norton; Mark R. Sheets; Kevin James Sheets Aaron Sheets
- Education: Enid High School; John Brown University
- Occupation: Educator Businessman Kiwanis International executive director

Military service
- Branch/service: United States Army
- Years of service: 1955-1958

James Lee Sheets (March 29, 1931 – March 1, 2020), known as Jim Sheets, was a businessman from Bella Vista, Arkansas who was a former member of the Arkansas House of Representatives in the Republican Party. From 1967 to 1968, Sheets represented Benton County for a single term in the lower legislative chamber.

Sheets was the first member of the Republican Party in the 20th century sent to the legislature from Benton County in the far northwestern portion of the state. In time, Benton County became the GOP’s banner county in Arkansas. Sheets did not seek reelection because of the time required away from his employment as public relations director of his alma mater, the Christian-affiliated John Brown University in Siloam Springs, Arkansas. At the time, evangelicals had not yet organized politically to become a vital part of the Republican voter base; with many still active in the Democratic Party.

== Background ==
Sheets was born in Arkansas City in Cowley County in southeastern Kansas, to June P. Sheets (1903–1982), originally from Fargo in Ellis County in northwestern Oklahoma, and the former Mae Robinson (1904–2002), a native of Pierce City in Lawrence County in southwestern Missouri. June Sheets was employed in Arkansas City as an agent for the Frisco Railroad, but in 1943, he was transferred as a dispatcher to Enid in northern Oklahoma. Therefore, Jim Sheets graduated in 1949 from Enid High School.

After having received his Bachelor of Arts degree in Bible and English in 1953, Sheets immediately joined the John Brown University staff as manager of the campus radio station. While attending John Brown University, he had met his future wife, the former Martha Hamlin, a native of Disney in Mayes County in northeastern Oklahoma. The couple married in 1954 and adopted four children.

From 1955 to 1958, Sheets served in the United States Army, partly under a secret clearance of the former Atomic Energy Commission at the Oakland Naval Supply Station in Oakland, California. After his military duties, Sheets returned to John Brown University 1958 as director of public relations and student recruitment, a position that he maintained until 1969. The John Brown University enrollment in 1958 was only 250 students, but before Sheets left the position, the number was nearing 800.

== Political activities ==
=== Relationship with Rockefeller ===
Sheets met Winthrop Rockefeller for the first time when both were seeking office in 1966, he for the state House and Rockefeller as the first of the post-Faubus era governors and the first Republican in the position since the Reconstruction era. Sheets recalls having excellent personal relations with Rockefeller though, like colleague George E. Nowotny of Fort Smith, he disagreed with Rockefeller on certain issues. In the 1967 legislative session, Sheets introduced a revised death penalty bill, but Rockefeller opposed capital punishment, a position at odds with most Arkansans in both parties. According to Sheets, Rockefeller told him that their disagreement on the death penalty would not affect their personal and political association. Sheets said that he was contacted at the time by J. Edgar Hoover, director of the Federal Bureau of Investigation, who presented "talking points", a term not yet coined, that the death penalty is a deterrent to murder because it causes some miscreants to think twice about the taking of life if they know that their own existence would be jeopardized.

Unlike Nowotny, who considered Rockefeller's drinking to have been serious in his later years, Sheets said that it appeared to him that reports of excessive liquor may have been exaggerated. In 1973, Sheets was among the mourners at Winthrop Rockefeller's funeral on Petit Jean Mountain, where he met Nelson Rockefeller, who the next year would begin a short tenure as Vice President of the United States.

=== Challenging Kelly Bryant ===
Upon leaving John Brown University in 1969, Sheets took the position of full-time executive director of the Siloam Springs Chamber of Commerce, but the next year he was back in politics as the Republican nominee against the Democratic Secretary of State, Kelly Bryant of Hope in Hempstead County in south Arkansas, also known as the hometown of later Governors Bill Clinton and Mike Huckabee. Sheets first defeated John Thompson of Morrilton in the Republican primary for secretary of state, 35,954 (68 percent) to 16,881 (32 percent). In the campaign, Sheets was invited to ride on Rockefeller's helicopter. Ultimately, he won majorities in his own Benton County and in Searcy County. Sheets lost by a single vote in Washington County, where many of the local Democrats were also political reformers hostile to Bryant. Official results showed Bryant with 360,209 (62.3 percent) to Sheets’ 216,752 (37.7 percent).

Sheets recalls that the last pre-election poll that he had seen showed the race competitive, but the situation changed quickly when U.S. Senator J. William Fulbright lent Bryant the use of his political team. Sheets said that he had never expected to win the race though he finished in the balloting some twenty thousand votes ahead of Rockefeller.

In waging a campaign against Kelly Bryant, Sheets recalls that he was hoping to establish regional name identification for a possible 1972 congressional race. Then U.S. Representative John Paul Hammerschmidt of Arkansas's 3rd congressional district, a Harrison Republican businessman and Medal of Honor winner first elected in 1966, along with Rockefeller and Maurice L. Britt at the top of the ticket, had informed Sheets that he believed, incorrectly as it turned out, that U.S. Senator John Little McClellan would retire in 1972. Had that scenario developed, Hammerschmidt, known in particular for his prompt and effective constituent service, planned to run for the Senate and would have endorsed Sheets as his preferred House successor.

=== Managing the Ford campaign ===
By the mid-1970s, Sheets had left the chamber of commerce position and was engaged in real estate in Siloam Springs. He was an alternate delegate to the 1976 Republican National Convention that met in Kansas City, Missouri, to nominate the Ford-Dole ticket, narrowly preferred by the delegates over the rival slate of Ronald W. Reagan and Richard S. Schweiker. Dole took the second spot with Ford as Nelson Rockefeller had earlier withdrawn from contention. Sheets managed the Arkansas state campaign for Ford-Dole, with his counterpart for Jimmy Carter and Walter F. Mondale having been Bill Clinton, who ran unopposed that year for Attorney General of Arkansas. Although Sheets visited most of the counties in the campaign, Ford polled only 35 percent of the vote in Arkansas, with the larger Republican vote confined to its traditional stronghold in northwestern Arkansas.

== Kiwanis International ==
In 1953, Sheets joined Kiwanis International; in 1965, he served a year as governor of the Missouri-Arkansas District during the golden anniversary of the organization. After he made a Kiwanis presentation to Democratic Governor Orval Faubus, Sheets encountered Faubus on several occasions while Faubus was selling individual copies of his scrapbook memoirs, Down from the Hills: I had no problems with Faubus. He was amicable. Many of the things he did were what the people of Arkansas then wanted."

In 1982, Sheets left Siloam Springs to become executive director of the Kiwanis International Foundation, based in Indianapolis, a position that he retained until he retired in 1998. In this role, he traveled to nearly fifty countries, including Australia and New Zealand, to establish Kiwanis clubs. He spurred the raising of $100 million to finance, in conjunction with UNICEF, a campaign to eradicate iodine deficiency in the Third World. "We got iodine into almost every country in the world," Sheet recalls.

== Retired in Benton County ==
Thereafter, Sheets and his wife returned to Benton County and settled in Bella Vista. The couple attends the Village Baptist Church, a Southern Baptist congregation in Bella Vista.

Reflecting on his life, Sheets remarks: "I've loved everything I've done. I attribute it to the Lord’s blessing and his leading me through my life."

Preceded by	Arkansas State Representative for Benton County; 1967–1968	Succeeded by Preston Bynum
