= Sager Creek =

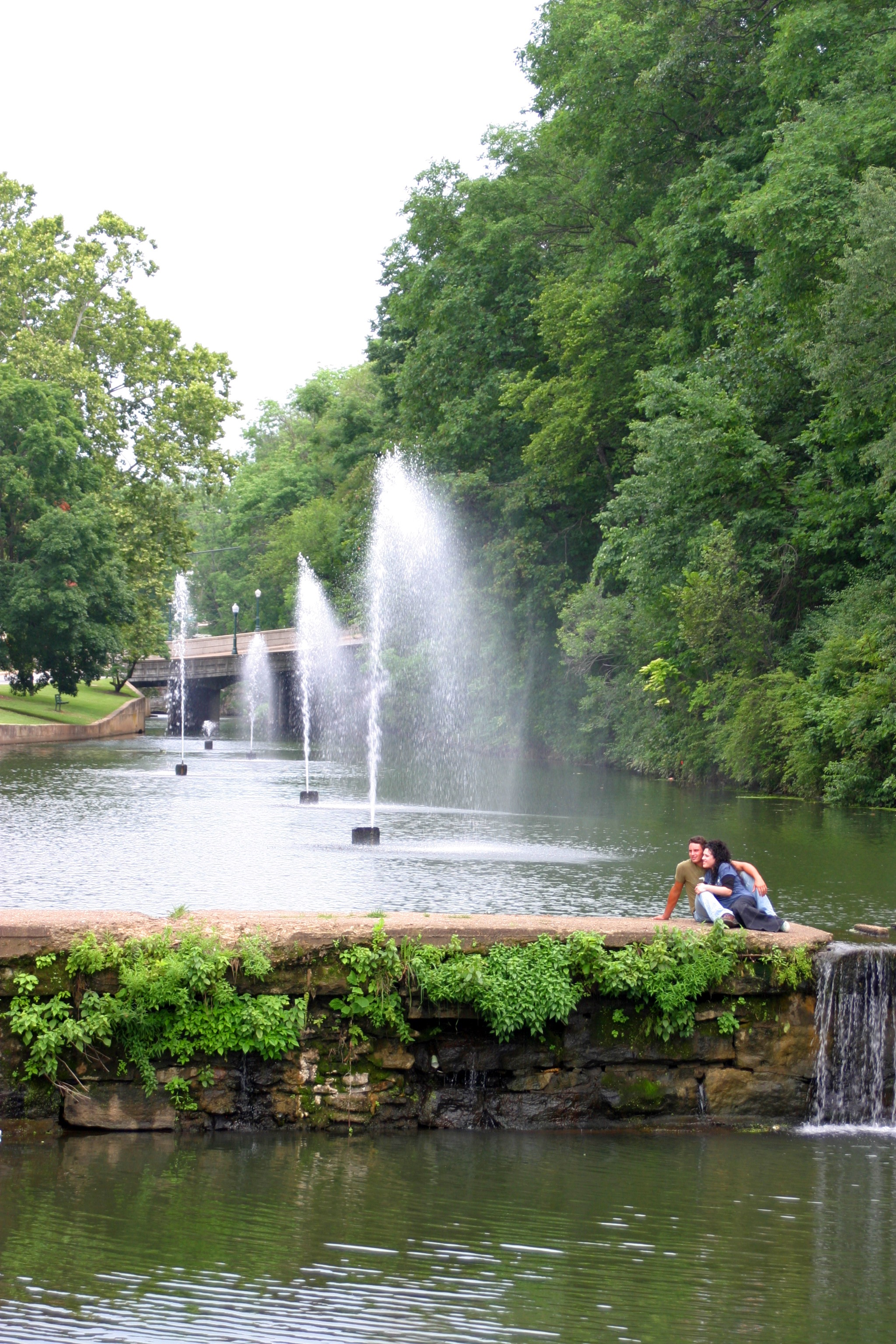

Location
- Country: United States
- State: Arkansas, Oklahoma
- Region: Southern United States
- City: Siloam Springs, AR

Physical characteristics
- Source
  - location: Benton County, Arkansas, Ozarks
  - coordinates: 36°13′23″N 94°28′36″W
- Mouth: Flint Creek
  - location: Delaware County, Oklahoma, Green Country
  - coordinates: 36°12′41″N 94°27′23″W
- Length: 13.4 mi (21.6 km)
- Basin size: 19.1 mi^{2} (49 km^{2})
- Discharge
  - location: West Siloam Springs, Oklahoma
  - average: 24.2 cu ft/s (0.69 m^{3}/s)
  - minimum: 3.63 cu ft/s (0.103 m^{3}/s)
  - maximum: 198.4 cu ft/s (5.62 m^{3}/s)

Basin features
- River system: Illinois River watershed
- Tributaries
  - left: Fountain Creek, Pawnee River, Verdigris River, Neosho River
  - right: Cimarron River, Salt Fork Arkansas River, Canadian River, Poteau River

Sager Creek is a 13.4-mile-long (21.6 km) creek that runs through downtown Siloam Springs, Arkansas, in the United States. It is a tributary of Flint Creek that flows to the Illinois River, which in turn flows to the Arkansas River and thus is part of the Mississippi River watershed. Sager Creek is named after Simon Sager, who is largely thought to be the founder of Siloam Springs.

== History ==
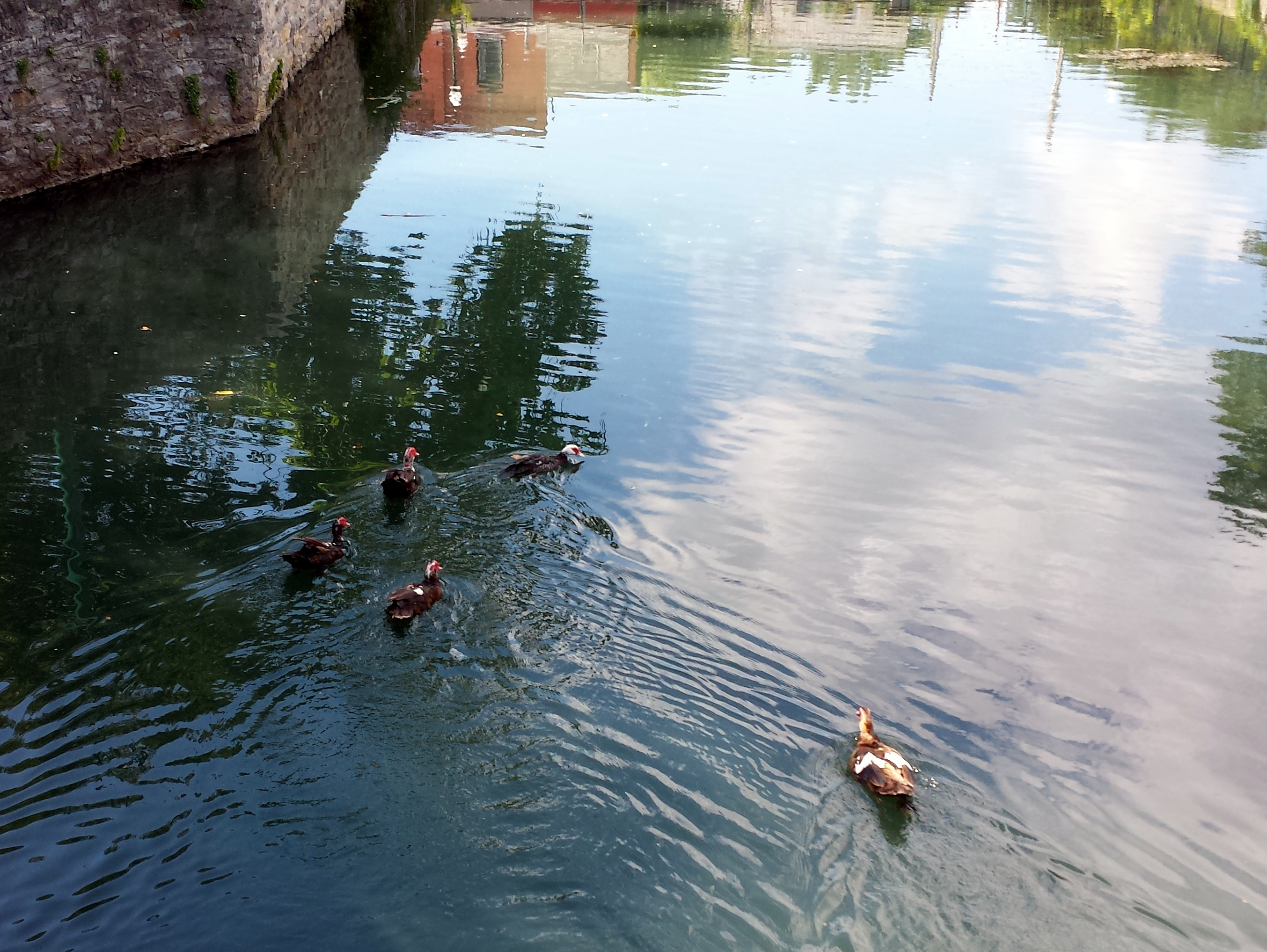
Ducks float on Sager Creek as downtown Siloam Springs reflects on the water's surface

Simon Sager and family came from Lippe, Germany and landed in Baltimore, MD. They went first to a German community near St. Louis. They then moved to Westport, MO, just south of present-day Kansas City. From there they came down to Sager Creek. Simon Sager was the family patriarch and settled near Sager Creek, which was also known as Spring Creek according to Sanborn Fire Maps as late as 1897. The community is known as Hico. They later moved to near the present site of the Siloam Springs Municipal Golf Course on Box Springs where the Sager Cabin lay where Simon was killed. That cabin was abandoned but remained until late in the 20th Century. The original cabin lay on John Brown University campus and has been restored. Simon Sager was killed during the Civil War when Pin Indians (pro-North Cherokee) came to his cabin. Some of the Sager children were in the Confederate Army.

Siloam Springs was known as Hico until after the Civil War. It was originally platted as Siloam City but quickly became known as Siloam Springs.

Siloam Springs was a health resort in the early 1900s with a number of healing waters; Downtown Springs, Indian Healing Springs and a few others. The present-day town is reminiscent of its Victorian heritage. The original Sager Cabin is on the grounds of John Brown University in Siloam Springs.

== Downtown Siloam Springs ==
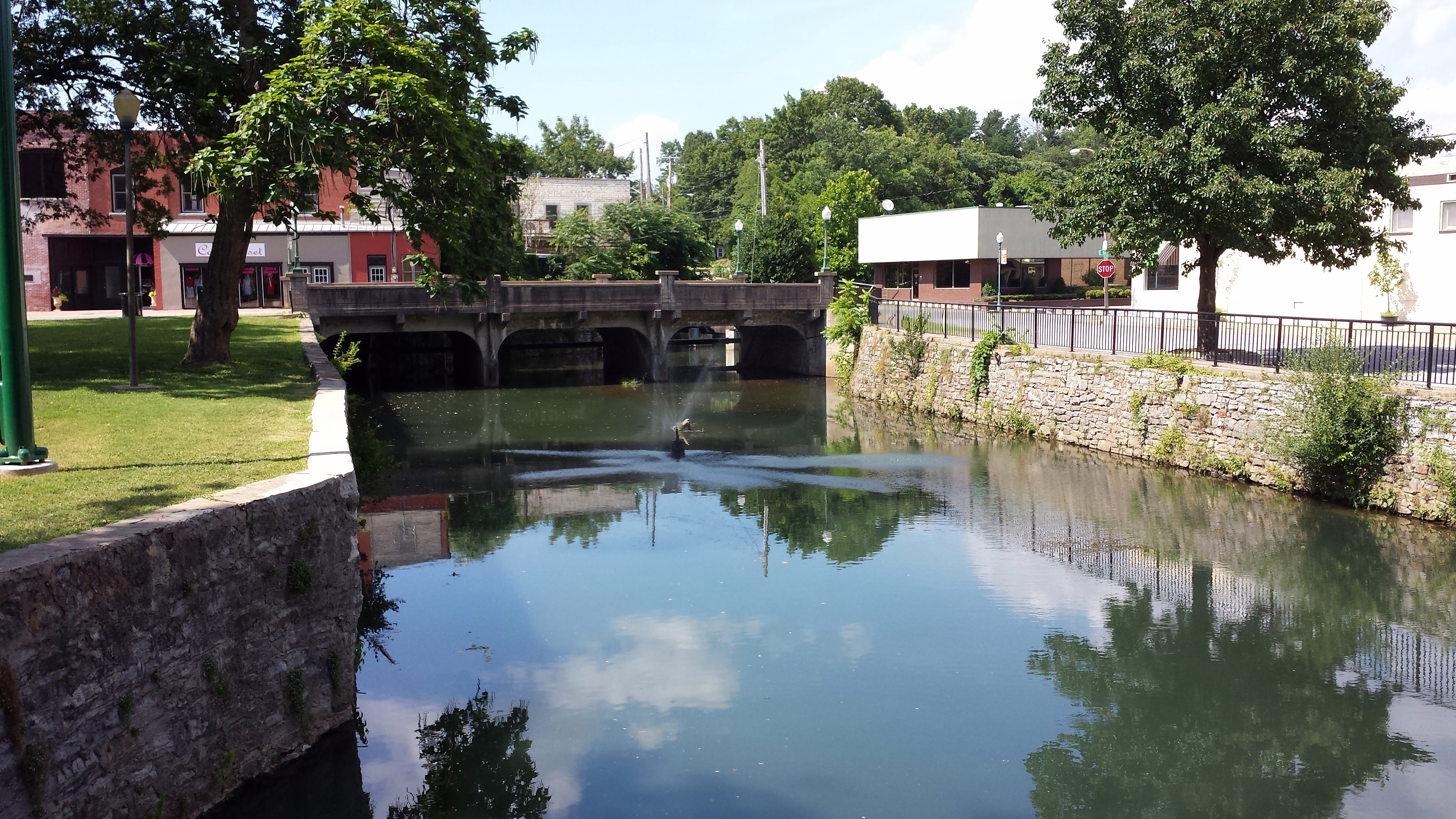
Sager Creek slowly winds through Twin Springs Park in downtown Siloam Springs

Sager Creek flows through downtown Siloam Springs through a manmade channel built in the 1880s. Although many of the homes and businesses along the creek are located on high ground, the creek has flooded significantly several times over the years. A severe flood in 1892 damaged much of the early business district of the city, and a large flood in 1972 raised water in some commercial structures 7 feet (2.1 m) and caused three deaths.

== Restoration ==
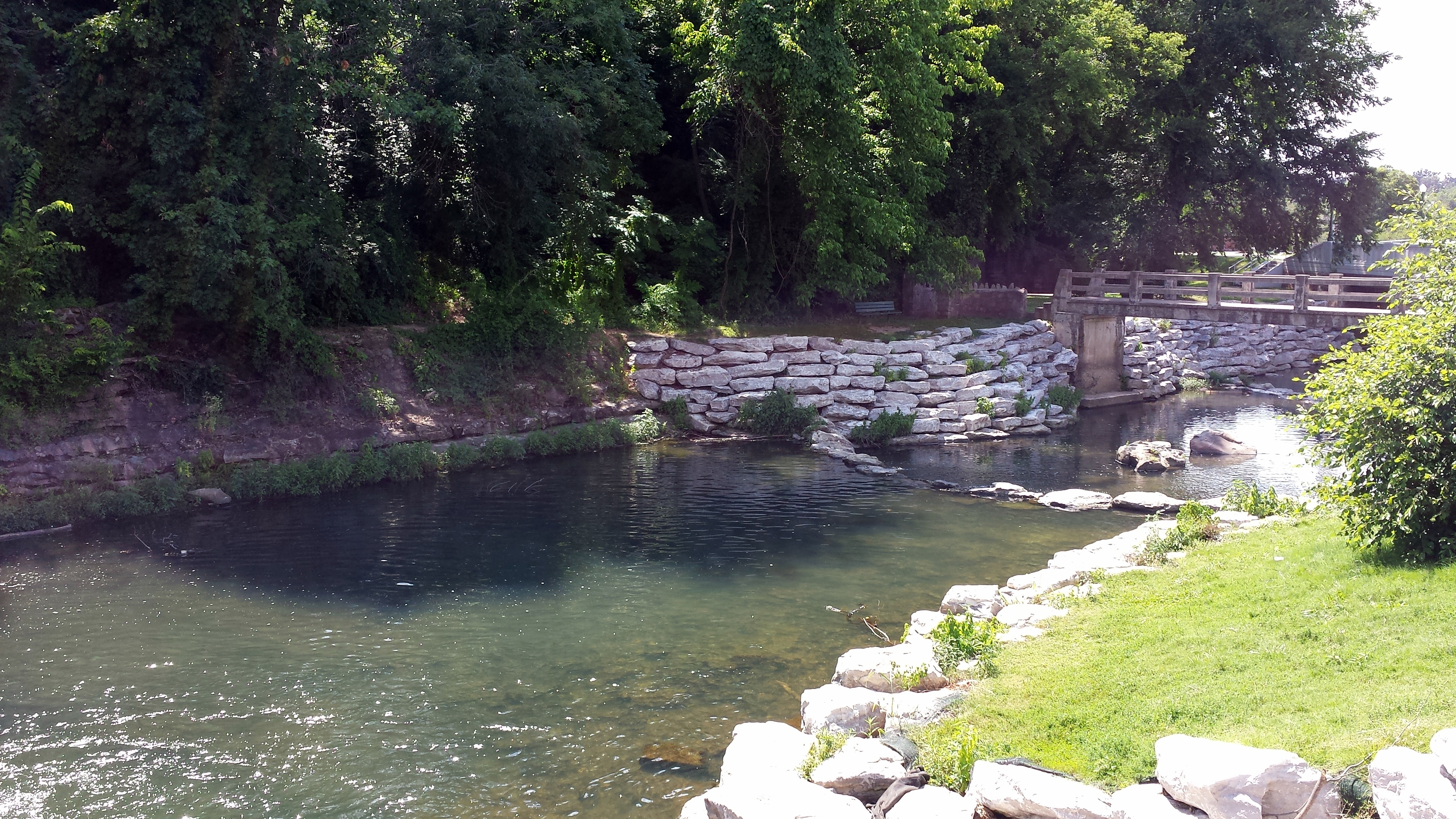
Restored portion of Sager Creek

Siloam Springs has recently undertaken restoration efforts on Sager Creek. Phase one improvements were approved by the Arkansas Department of Environmental Quality (ADEQ) in 2008 and included removing a dam and installing boulder revetments, step pools and riffles along the creek. Phase two sought to address algae that grew in the creek during the summer, causing aesthetic and odor issues. It also tried to restore original hydrology, geomorphology and water quality. Jointly funded by the Environmental Protection Agency, the Arkansas Natural Resource Commission and the City of Siloam Springs, the project included channel redesign, stream bank stabilization and planting riparian buffers. Boulder steps and sloped vegetated buffers have allowed public access to the creek, which was not possible with the previous stream configuration.

=== Nutrient loading ===
Sager Creek feeds into Flint Creek, which ultimately feeds the Illinois River. This river has been the subject of much debate and regulation in recent years. As a tributary within this watershed, Sager Creek's nutrient loading has also been subject to research by environmental agencies in both Arkansas and Oklahoma, as early as 1978.

==== Phosphorus ====
The Siloam Springs Wastewater Plant, which discharges treated effluent to Sager Creek, currently has a NPDES permit allowing an interim total phosphorus discharge limit of 1 mg/L. This interim limit was the result of a lawsuit between Arkansas and Oklahoma that was taken to the United States Supreme Court. A Total maximum daily load (TMDL) study is currently underway in the Illinois River watershed to determine the natural background loading of several key pollutants. It is anticipated that the final total phosphorus limits resulting from the TMDL study will be significantly lower than the interim limit.

==== Nitrogen ====
Sager Creek was listed as high importance on the 2012 ADEQ Impaired Waterbodies List (303(d) List) for a high nitrate loading due to a municipal point source.
