= House at 305 E. Ashley =

Historic house in Arkansas, United States

- U.S. National Register of Historic Places
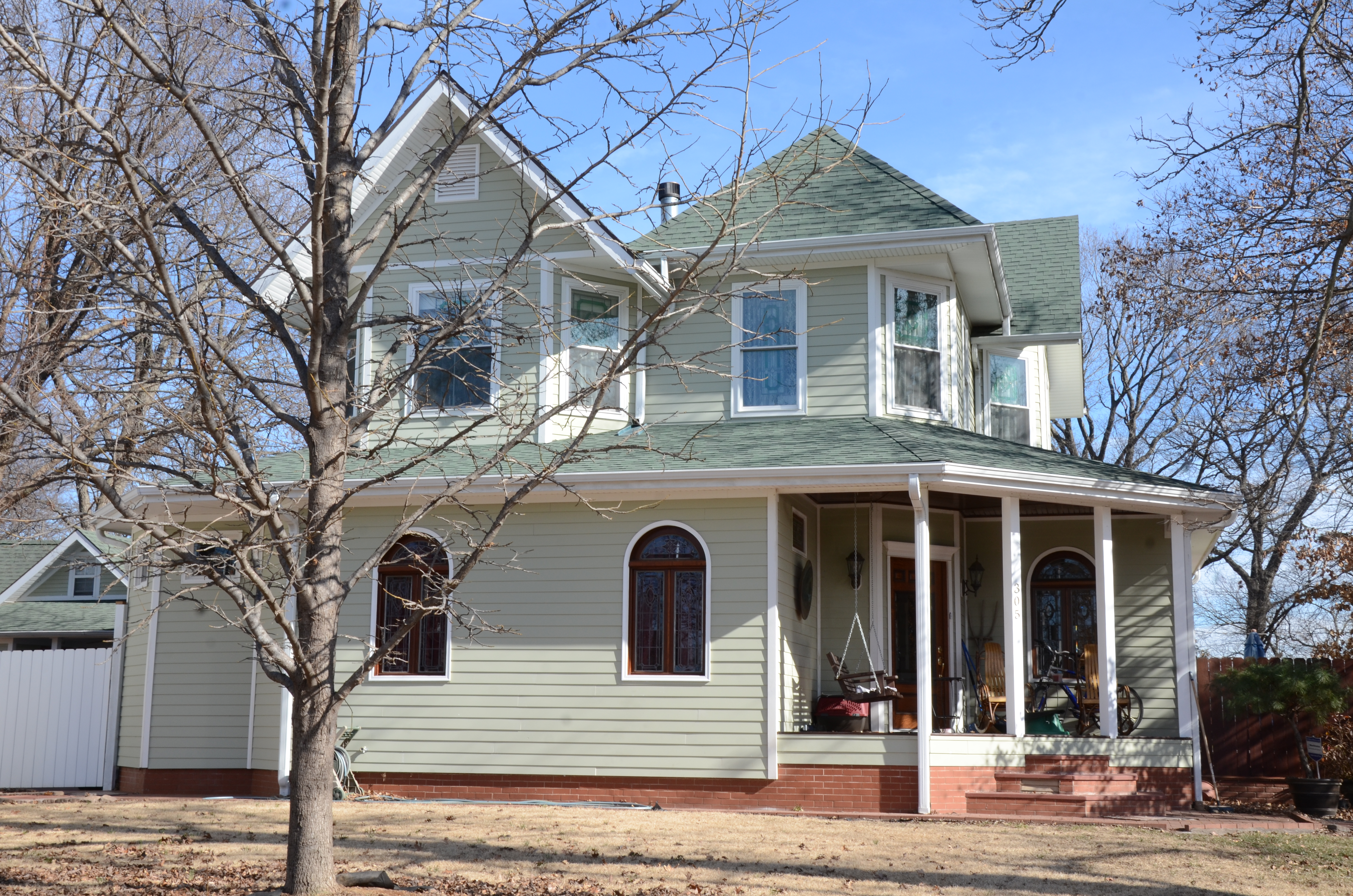

- Location within Arkansas Location within the United States
- Location: 305 E. Ashley, Siloam Springs, Arkansas
- Coordinates: 36°11′13″N 94°32′16″W
- Area: less than one acre
- Built: 1900
- MPS: Benton County MRA
- NRHP reference No.: 87002427
- Added to NRHP: January 28, 1988

The House at 305 E. Ashley in Siloam Springs, Arkansas is a high-quality local example of Queen Anne Victorian architecture. Built c. 1900, it is a two-story wood-frame structure, with asymmetrical massing that includes beveled corners, projecting polygonal bay sections, and a pyramidal roof topped with a metal crest. It is finished in novelty siding, with pilastered corner boards, and has a wraparound porch with simple columns.

The house was listed on the National Register of Historic Places in 1988.

== See also ==
- National Register of Historic Places listings in Benton County, Arkansas
