= Preston Bynum =

American politician

Arkansas State Representative for Benton County
- In office January 1, 1969 – December 31, 1980
- Preceded by: Jim Sheets
- Succeeded by: Jerry E. Hinshaw

Personal details
- Born: Preston Conrad Bynum; June 8, 1939 Pryor Creek, Oklahoma, U.S.
- Died: October 31, 2018 (aged 79) Lakeland, Florida, U.S.
- Resting place: Oak Hill Cemetery
- Party: Republican
- Spouse: Linda Allen Brown
- Occupation: Politician; Lobbyist

Preston Conrad Bynum (June 8, 1939 – October 31, 2018) was a lobbyist in Little Rock, Arkansas, United States, who served as a Republican member of the Arkansas House of Representatives from January 1969 to December 1980.

== Political career ==
Bynum was born in Pryor Creek, Oklahoma. He was an automobile dealer, with the Bynum Motor Company, the family business, in Siloam Springs, Arkansas when he was elected to the Arkansas General Assembly. Bynum died at his home in Lakeland, Florida, from heart failure. He succeeded fellow Republican Jim Sheets and became one of only four Republicans in the 100-member House.

During his third term in the House from 1973 to 1974, Bynum was the only Republican in the chamber. In 1974, he announced that he would run for governor but withdrew, and the nomination went to Ken Coon. He eventually served as the senior Republican member and the minority party leader of the House.

Bynum did not seek reelection in 1980 but instead served as chief of staff to Governor Frank D. White after White switched his affiliation from Democrat to Republican. Bynum and House colleague Carolyn Pollan of Fort Smith prepared the state budget by retaining previous figures from the Bill Clinton administration but with 5 percent across-the-board cuts.

== Lobbying ==
After leaving office, Bynum lobbied for a number of Arkansas clients through his Phoenix Investment Group, Inc., of Little Rock. He is a member of the Association of General Contractors. He was hired to represent the interests of Northwest Arkansas Community College in Bentonville. Bynum was named to the government affairs team of the Arkansas Independent Automobile Dealers Association.

=== Bribery ===
While employed as a lobbyist for the investment banking firm Stephens, Inc., Bynum was indicted for bribery in January 1995 by a federal grand jury. The U.S. government charged that Bynum paid Terry Duwayne Busbee, then a commissioner of the Utility Authority of Escambia County, Florida, to steer bond-underwriting business to Stephens, Inc. Two months later, Bynum pleaded guilty to a single count of bribery.

Under a plea bargain, he was fined $25,000 and given a two-year federal prison sentence. He was further forbidden to represent clients in the securities business for the rest of his life. Bynum reported to federal prison in July 1995. In the fall of 1996, he was allowed to finish his sentence at the St. Francis House, a halfway facility in Little Rock. He was given use of his old offices at Stephens, Inc., to prepare for his future employment. He was released on July 1, 1998.

== Personal life ==
Bynum married the former Linda Allen and they have 4 daughters. Leasa, Angela, Charlotte, Rebecca.

Political offices
Preceded by James Lee "Jim" Sheets	Arkansas State Representative for Benton County; 1969–1980	Succeeded by Jerry E. Hinshaw
