= Sawyer Hill =

American singer (born 1999)

- Also known as: Sawyer Hill
- Born: Jacob Sawyer Hill; August 15, 1999 (age 27)
- Origin: Siloam Springs, Arkansas, U.S.
- Genres: Indie rock; Alt rock
- Occupation: Musician
- Years active: 2022-present
- Label: AWAL
- Formerly of: Drawing Blanks

Sawyer Hill is an American singer from Arkansas who performs in the alt rock and indie rock genres. He began performing in bars, but in 2022, began to utilize social media to promote his songs. His single "Look at the Time" topped the Spotify Viral 50 in 2023. His first album, Everybody's Home, Nobody's Happy, was released in August 2026.

== Biography ==
Hill was born and raised in Siloam Springs, Arkansas. As a freshman in high school, he joined a band made up of seniors. After his bandmates graduated, he began performing in bars all around Northwest Arkansas with them, receiving a notarized affidavit from his parents permitting him to perform despite his young age. Hill previously served as a vocalist and rhythm guitarist for rock band Drawing Blanks before pursuing a solo career. He began utilizing social media to promote his music, and has garnered over a million followers across platforms.

His first viral video features a clip of his song "Look At The Time", which went on to top the Spotify Viral 50. He went on to sign with AWAL. He then released a number of singles, including "Never Once", "High On My Lows", and "For the Hell Of It". He released "Jimmy's Gone Numb" in 2026.

He's also known for his cover of Folsom Prison Blues, which has become a major part of his performances.

He performed at The Troubadour in 2025. He opened for the North American leg of Yungblud's IDOLS tour in 2025. He is set to tour Australia in 2027.

On October 14, 2026, he got into a car accident.

== Discography ==
=== Albums ===
- Everybody's Home, Nobody's Happy (AWAL, 2026)

=== EPs ===
- Heartbreak Hysteria (AWAL, 2025)

=== Singles ===
- "Jimmy's Gone Numb" (2026)
- "Aiming At My Head" (2025)
- "Need Me Now" (2025)
- "For the Hell Of It" (2024)
- "High On My Lows" (2024)
- "Feel Right Now" (2024)
- "Symphony" (2024)
- "Never Once" (2023)
- "Firestarters" (2023)
- "Look At The Time" (2023)
- "Your Scene" (2022)
