= The Folk Sampler =

- Country of origin: United States
- Language(s): English
- Syndicates: self-syndicated
- Starring: Mike Flynn
- Created by: Mike Flynn and Sandy Flynn
- Recording studio: Siloam Springs, Arkansas
- Original release: 1978 – June 2018
- Website: www.folksampler.com

The Folk Sampler was a nationally syndicated show, produced and hosted by Mike Flynn, that showcased folk, blues, and bluegrass music both modern and old.

== History ==
Originating as a 15-minute program at WMBI in Chicago by host Mike Flynn, it only aired for 13 episodes. After taking a job in Tulsa, Oklahoma, Flynn began broadcasting another early version of The Folk Sampler, from first KBEZ then at KRAV. This incarnation ended following Flynn's graduation. After moving to Siloam Springs, Arkansas, he began broadcasting the now hour-long program in 1978. In 1982 the program became syndicated initially through American Public Radio then through NPR. Each week's show has a theme which all songs featured fit into either by release date or actual song theme. It is reported that he spends 15–20 hours a week preparing each show.

== Host ==
Flynn grew up in sparsely populated rural Kansas. He studied broadcasting at the University of Tulsa, Oklahoma and worked on stations KRAV and KBEZ, with a period working in Chicago on WMBI. He then worked as a news anchor and weatherman on KOTV Channel 6 in Tulsa. He moved to John Brown University to teach communications, retiring as head of department in 1999.

In 1977 he and his wife, Sandy Flynn, moved to Siloam Springs, Arkansas bordering the Arkansas Ozarks, starting The Folk Sampler, with his wife as co-producer. In 1993, Sandy died; although Mike had threatened to quit doing music if she died before him, she had been able to convince him that carrying on the folk music tradition would be just what he needed. He continues to carry the tradition with each week's broadcast.

In the broadcast of April 21, 2018, Flynn announced that he will be retiring and that The Folk Sampler will be ceasing production with episodes airing through June. Repeats still air on some public radio stations that carried the show first-run.
