= John Eason (politician) =

American politician

Member of the Arkansas House of Representatives
- In office 1999–2003

Personal details
- Party: Democratic

John Eason is an American politician who served in the Arkansas House of Representatives from 1999 to 2003. He lived in Marianna, Arkansas.
