= KREB =

- Gentry, Arkansas; United States
- Broadcast area: Fayetteville (North West Arkansas)
- Frequency: 1190 kHz
- Branding: Ozarks 100

Programming
- Format: Red Dirt country
- Affiliations: ABC News Radio

Ownership
- Owner: John Lykins and Steve Butler; (Rox Radio Group, LLC)
- Sister stations: KFFK, KBVA, KXRD, KXVB

History
- First air date: 1968
- Former call signs: KJEM (1979–1995); KESE (1995–2000)

Technical information
- Licensing authority: FCC
- Facility ID: 30935
- Class: D
- Power: 3,000 watts day
- Transmitter coordinates: 36°23′18″N 94°11′34″W
- Translator: 100.5 K263CB (Springdale)

Links
- Public license information: Public file; LMS
- Webcast: Listen live
- Website: reddirtnwa.com

KREB (1190 AM) is a radio station licensed to Gentry, Arkansas, United States. It serves the Fayetteville (North West Arkansas) area. The station is currently owned by John Lykins and Steve Butler, through licensee Rox Radio Group, LLC. In the mid-1960s the KREB call sign was a small rock & roll AM station in Shreveport, Louisiana. Before being sold in 1962, it had converted to "pop" music to boost time sales before going under.

Former logo

On June 21, 2024, KREB changed their format from a simulcast of classic hits-formatted KBVA 106.5 FM Bella Vista to Red Dirt country, branded as "Red Dirt 100.5".

On May 22, 2025, KREB rebranded as "Ozarks 100".
