= KFFK =

Simulcasts KREB Gentry
- Decatur, Arkansas; United States
- Broadcast area: Fayetteville (Northwest Arkansas)
- Frequency: 1390 kHz
- Branding: Ozarks 100

Programming
- Format: Red Dirt country
- Affiliations: ABC News Radio

Ownership
- Owner: John Lykins and Steve Butler; (Rox Radio Group, LLC)
- Sister stations: KREB, KBVA, KXVB, KXRD

History
- First air date: September 16, 1954

Technical information
- Licensing authority: FCC
- Facility ID: 31882
- Class: D
- Power: 800 watts day
- Transmitter coordinates: 36°24′42″N 94°27′02″W
- Translator: 100.7 K264DA (Decatur)

Links
- Public license information: Public file; LMS
- Webcast: Listen live
- Website: reddirtnwa.com

KFFK (1390 AM) is a radio station broadcasting a classic hits format. It is licensed to Decatur, Arkansas, United States, and serves the Fayetteville (Northwest Arkansas) area. The station is owned by John Lykins and Steve Butler, through licensee Rox Radio Group, LLC.

On June 21, 2024, KFFK changed their format from a simulcast of classic hits-formatted KBVA 106.5 FM Bella Vista to a simulcast of Red Dirt country-formatted KREB 1190 AM Gentry.

On May 22, 2025, KFFK rebranded as "Ozarks 100".
