= KXRD =

Radio station in Fayetteville, Arkansas

- Fayetteville, Arkansas; United States
- Broadcast area: Fayetteville, Arkansas
- Frequency: 96.7 MHz
- Branding: 96.7 The Bull

Programming
- Format: Country

Ownership
- Owner: John Lykins; (Rox Radio Group, LLC)
- Sister stations: KXVB, KFFK, KBVA, KREB

History
- First air date: 1980 (as KZRK-FM)
- Former call signs: KZRK-FM (1979–1985); KDYN-FM (1985–2012); KCYT (2012–2021)
- Call sign meaning: K X Red Dirt (previous format)

Technical information
- Licensing authority: FCC
- Facility ID: 51098
- Class: C3
- ERP: 4,100 watts
- HAAT: 166.3 meters
- Transmitter coordinates: 36°08′49.7″N 94°11′13.3″W

Links
- Public license information: Public file; LMS
- Webcast: Listen live
- Website: nwabull.com

KXRD (96.7 FM) is a radio station licensed to serve Fayetteville, Arkansas, United States. The station is owned by John Lykins, through licensee Rox Radio Group, LLC.

== Programming ==
KXRD broadcasts a country music format. The station airs a mix of current hits and classic country songs from the late 1980s to the 2020s.

== History ==
On March 15, 2021, KCYT shifted from country to Red Dirt country, branded as "Red Dirt 96.7" under new KXRD call letters.

On June 21, 2024, KXRD changed their format from Red Dirt country (which moved to KREB 1190 AM Gentry) to country music, branded as "96.7 The Bull".
