= KBVA =

Radio station in Bella Vista, Arkansas, United States

- Bella Vista, Arkansas; United States
- Broadcast area: Northwest Arkansas, Southwest Missouri and northeast Oklahoma
- Frequency: 106.5 MHz
- Branding: 106.5 KBVA

Programming
- Format: Classic hits
- Affiliations: ABC News Radio

Ownership
- Owner: John Lykins; (Rox Radio Group, LLC)
- Sister stations: KXVB, KXRD, KREB, KFFK

History
- First air date: November 1991
- Call sign meaning: K Bella VistaArkansas (city of license)

Technical information
- Licensing authority: FCC
- Facility ID: 23365
- Class: C2
- ERP: 50,000 watts
- HAAT: 173 meters (568 ft)
- Transmitter coordinates: 36°18′21.00″N 94°27′29.00″W

Links
- Public license information: Public file; LMS
- Webcast: Listen Live
- Website: 1065kbva.com

KBVA (106.5 FM) is a commercial radio station licensed to Bella Vista, Arkansas, and serving Southwest Missouri, Northwest Arkansas and northeast Oklahoma. The station is owned by John Lykins, through licensee Rox Radio Group, LLC. The station airs a classic hits format, playing hits from the 70s, 80s and 90s, with a slightly larger playlist. The playlist includes artist's such as Journey, Elton John, Madonna, Eagles, Michael Jackson, Commodores, U2 and Ace of Base. The station contains hourly news updates which are provided by ABC News Radio in addition to local news updates hourly during daytime hours seven days a week.

The transmitter is off Y City Road in Decatur, Arkansas. KBVA's signal is heard in sections of Arkansas, Missouri and Oklahoma.

== History ==
In November 1991, the station signed on the air. KBVA's original owner was Gayla Joy Hendren McKenzie, the daughter of Republican politician Kim Hendren and the sister of current state senator Jim Hendren. The station carried political advertising for Kim Hendren's unsuccessful bid in 2010 for the United States Senate.

McKenzie sold KBVA to Hog Radio effective July 31, 2017 for $1.15 million, which rebranded the station from "Variety 106.5" to "Lite 106.5". It was the only radio station in the Fayetteville market to have an Adult Standards format in 2021.

Hog Radio sold KBVA, three sister stations, and a translator to John Lykins' Rox Radio Group, LLC for $3 million effective January 27, 2021.
