= KXVB =

Radio station in Greenland, Arkansas, United States

- Greenland, Arkansas; United States
- Broadcast area: Fayetteville, Arkansas
- Frequency: 101.5 MHz
- Branding: Freedom FM 101.5

Programming
- Format: Conservative Talk
- Affiliations: USA Radio News; Compass Media Networks; Premiere Networks; Radio America

Ownership
- Owner: John Lykins; (Rox Radio Group, LLC)
- Sister stations: KXRD, KBVA, KREB, KFFK

History
- First air date: May 1, 2012
- Former call signs: KFMD (2012); KFMD-FM (2012–2022)
- Call sign meaning: "Vibe" (previous branding)

Technical information
- Licensing authority: FCC
- Facility ID: 88358
- Class: C3
- ERP: 5,500 watts
- HAAT: 213.5 meters
- Transmitter coordinates: 35°54′06″N 94°06′06″W

Links
- Public license information: Public file; LMS
- Webcast: Listen Live
- Website: www.479.media/freedomfm/

KXVB (101.5 FM) is a radio station in Greenland, Arkansas, serving the Fayetteville area.

== History ==
The station debuted in 2012 with a classic hits format.

As a classic hits station, they played a select number of 1960s hits, along with 70s, 80s, and 90s music, most notably Martha and the Vandellas original recording of "Dancing In The Street". Starting in the 2020s, some hits from the 2000s were thrown in. These include songs such as "It's My Life" by Bon Jovi, "Underneath It All" by No Doubt featuring Lady Saw, and Counting Crows' version of Joni Mitchell's "Big Yellow Taxi", which features Vanessa Carlton. Star 101.5 aired Brock and Marci from 6–10, Staci, later Ro on the Radio, mid-days from 10–3, Tim in the afternoons from 3–7, with Throwback Nation Radio in late evenings. The Tom Kent show was aired late evening on weekends.

In December 2020, Ro On The Radio and Brock and Marci were let go as part of the station's sale to Butler Broadcasting Company, LLC, the former owners of KXNA.

On January 27, 2021, the then-KFMD-FM and its sister stations were sold to Rox Radio. As soon as the sale closed on January 31, 2021, KFMD-FM dumped its classic hits format and began stunting with songs with the word "change" in the title (i.e. "Changes" by David Bowie, "Winds of Change" by Scorpions, and "A Change is Gonna Come" by Sam Cooke), promoting a "change" at Noon the following day. At 11:30 AM the following day, the stunting shifted to a loop of "The Final Countdown" by Europe, the final playing of which had simulated ground control transmissions counting down to the change. At the promised time, KFMD-FM flipped to Hot AC as "101.5 My FM", taking indirect aim at established competition in KMXF, KMCK-FM, and KEZA. The first song on "My FM" was "Good as Hell" by Lizzo.

On February 25, 2022, at 5 p.m., KFMD-FM flipped to a classic-leaning rhythmic contemporary format, branded as "101.5 The Vibe", with the first song being "It's a Vibe" by 2 Chainz, Ty Dolla Sign, Trey Songz and Jhené Aiko. On February 28, KFMD-FM changed call letters to KXVB to match the "Vibe" branding.

On April 30, 2026, KXVB dropped the rhythmic format and began stunting with a loop of “Changes” by 2Pac and “It's Gonna Be Me” by NSYNC, followed by day-long loops of songs with “change” in their titles, and Star Wars-themed songs. On May 5 at 10:55 a.m., the station changed to a conservative talk format as "Freedom FM 101.5".
