= John Brown University =

Private Christian college in Siloam Springs, Arkansas, US

Coordinates: 36°11′24″N 94°33′31″W

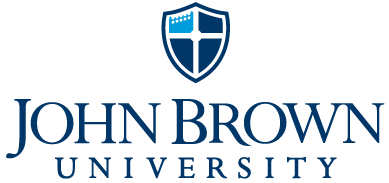
- Former names: Southwestern Collegiate Institute (1919–1920); John E. Brown College (1920–1934)
- Motto: "Christ Over All"
- Type: Private university
- Established: 1919; 107 years ago
- Accreditation: HLC
- Religious affiliation: Interdenominational Christianity
- Academic affiliations: Council for Christian Colleges and Universities; Space-grant
- Endowment: $212.6 million (2025)
- President: Charles "Chip" Pollard
- Faculty: 88
- Students: 2,343
- Undergraduates: 1,376
- Postgraduates: 483
- Location: Siloam Springs, Arkansas, U.S.
- Campus: 200 acres (81 ha); Small town
- Colors: Royal Blue & Gold
- Nickname: Golden Eagles
- Sporting affiliations: NAIA – Sooner
- Website: www.jbu.edu

John Brown University (JBU) is a private Christian university in Siloam Springs, Arkansas, United States. Founded in 1919, JBU enrolls approximately 2,250 students from over 30 states and 40 countries across its traditional undergraduate, graduate, online, and concurrent education programs. JBU is accredited by the Higher Learning Commission and competes athletically in the Sooner Athletic Conference.

The 200-acre (0.81 km^{2}) main campus in northwest Arkansas has been the home of the university since its founding in 1919. As of the 2025–26 academic year, JBU has around 1,400 traditional undergraduate students on campus, with the majority living in university housing. In addition, the university operates a location in Little Rock, Arkansas, which offers graduate counseling programs.

== History ==
=== John E. Brown: background ===
John E. Brown was not afforded the opportunity to pursue much education, as his family's financial difficulties forced him to begin working at the age of 11. As a teenaged laborer in Arkansas, Brown encountered the Salvation Army and underwent a conversion experience. After his conversion, he became an itinerant Methodist evangelist, with his travels taking him across Arkansas, Missouri, Kansas and the Indian Territory.

Subsequent to becoming an evangelist, Brown accepted a position as president of Scarritt College in Neosho. His two years as president were instrumental in developing his plan to establish his own college. However, Brown felt that the strong emphasis of that school on education without the benefit of life training was harmful to the students. As he said in 1903, "It might be my privilege to have a part in the building of school that would turn the minds of youth back from this exaggerated concept of the value of book knowledge, to the realization that all this is valuable only as it becomes a background for, or the foundation under, the real things of life."

=== Early years: presidency of John E. Brown Sr. 1919–1948 ===
Maintaining this goal of establishing a college that would provide an interdenominational Christian education for needy students, who like himself, might not have had a chance of receiving an education, Brown laid the foundation in 1919 for the institution that would later be called John Brown University. To pay for the institution's free tuition, Brown developed his school as a Christian vocational college. Students worked jobs such as carpentry and helped in constructing the buildings on campus. The typical work-day was four hours in addition to class time.

Apparently seeking to expand the reach of the growing college, John Brown announced in 1934 that the school was to be changed into a four-year university. The new university was divided into three colleges: the academic, vocational, and Bible colleges, fitting John Brown's stated vision of educating "head, heart, and hand". Spreading the new university's fields of study into new technology, Brown soon purchased a local radio station (KUOA) from which to broadcast Christian programming and his own sermons. Brown had used radio extensively before but was eager to get the resources of radio into the hands of the university. The expanded facilities, such as the distinctive Cathedral Group, which took root in the 1930s and 1940s, caused expenses for which the university had to pay. JBU began charging tuition in 1939, albeit a very small amount, and John Brown began to realize that financially, the vocational aspect of the school was more costly than anticipated. The university relied heavily on outside donations to break even financially.

=== Shift away from fundamentalism ===
As the university grew, Brown continued to preach throughout the country and on the radio. He was well known for his attacks on liquor, gambling, dancing, and other Christian fundamentalist issues of the time. This brought him into close proximity with Bob Jones Sr. founder of Bob Jones University, who presented Brown with an honorary doctorate in 1937.

In the 1940s, the close ties between JBU and the Christian fundamentalist movement began to wane, as the university took an unexpected turn away from fundamentalism. John Brown himself was always a proponent of interdenominationalism, and by aligning himself with Youth for Christ and other evangelical organizations after World War II, JBU was making a statement. John Brown's description of the school in 1948 as "interdenominational and definitely evangelical" is very telling in this regard.

=== Presidency of John E. Brown Jr. 1948–1979 ===
When John Brown Sr. relinquished control of the university (at least in name, since he remained as chairman of the board) in 1948, he began a period of much-needed consolidation. During World War II the student body had dropped to barely over a hundred, and the high echelons of the school's leadership were being run almost exclusively by the Brown family. Under the second Brown, professors and administrators were hired who had more advanced degrees, the Board of Trustees began to develop as a more independent body, and the students elected representatives to an independent council. All of this was beginning to occur by the end of the 1940s. Also, the university began construction on its Cathedral Group, composed of the chapel sanctuary, known as the Cathedral of the Ozarks, the Science building, and the Library, supposedly symbolizing in building form the idea of educating "head, heart, and hand". As much as JBU grew during this period, it still lacked accreditation and its student body continued to hover at around 300 during the 1950s. After the founder's death in 1957, John Brown Jr. worked to improve the quality of the education JBU provided. One crucial step was the abolition of the university's vocational college. Citing the shifting makeup of the workforce in the 1960s, the president did away with the vocational requirement, with the understanding that each department would provide practical career training as part of its curriculum. As a result of these reforms and others, JBU was finally nationally accredited by North Central Association.

During the turbulent years of the Vietnam War and the peace movement, JBU was relatively undisturbed. The school nurtured at that time a strong Christian Americanist vision of the world, tying American patriotism and political conservatism to conservative Christian faith. Instead of joining the anti-war movement, many JBU students joined organizations like Campus Crusade for Christ and traveled to other campuses. When those turbulent times had come and gone, JBU faced the 1970s with uncertainty. Academic standards were low and classes were not challenging. The university recognized the need to improve its quality, so it brought in Elton Trueblood, professor of philosophy at Earlham College, who had written The Idea of A College which argued that colleges should focus on liberal arts over career preparation. Trueblood's visits in the mid-1970s inspired JBU to look for ideas in Arthur F. Holmes' Idea of a Christian College in which a Christian college seeks to integrate faith and learning.

=== Presidency of John E. Brown III 1979–1993 ===
When John Brown Jr. stepped down as president, the job fell to his son, John Brown III, who immediately sought to improve the academic quality of the university. He visited Wheaton College (Illinois) and heralded its commitment to an integration of academic quality and Christian faith. To accompany his praise of Wheaton, he announced that the first consideration of JBU in selecting prospective students would be academic quality, and raising the entrance requirements. As expected, this began to attract more academically gifted students. Also, in the 1980s, an Honors Program was established. However, the third Brown made sure to maintain JBU's historic emphasis on career training, through its non-liberal arts programs such as Engineering, Construction Management, and Graphic Design. As well as academic programs, John Brown III instituted new building programs and a scholarship for Latin American students paid for by Sam Walton.

=== Presidency of George F. Ford 1993–1994 ===
John Brown III stepped down as president and was succeeded by George Ford, former Vice President of Roberts Wesleyan College, who left after less than a year because of internal difficulties with the university. During Ford's brief presidency, the university began offering an undergraduate degree completion program ("The Advance Program") in various locations in Northwest Arkansas.

=== Presidency of Lee Balzer 1994–2004 ===
The former president of Tabor College in Kansas, Lee Balzer, took office after the Ford controversy with a plan to expand the university's reach. He extended the Advance Program for non-traditional students in other cities by establishing branch centers in Fort Smith, Arkansas and Little Rock, Arkansas. During his presidency, JBU offered its first graduate degrees, initially in school counseling, and later including master's degrees in marriage and family therapy, leadership and ethics, business (MBA) and Christian ministry. The Center for Marriage and Family Studies was established during the Balzer presidency. Under President Balzer, JBU also founded the Soderquist Center for Business Leadership and Ethics to promote ethical principles in the business world. In addition, JBU's financial campaign at the end of the 1990s raised more than 39 million dollars to build Walker Student Center, Bell Science Hall, North Hall, and the Soderquist Business Center, all in the span of barely more than five years.

=== Presidency of Charles Pollard 2004–present ===
In 2004, Balzer retired. JBU selected Charles (Chip) Pollard, then Professor of English at Calvin College, to take the office of president for the institution. Since taking office, Pollard has overseen an interior and exterior renovation of the Cathedral Group, the expansion of North Hall, growth in the student body to over 2,000 students, and general consolidation after the rapid expansion of the past decade. Pollard's most notable legacy will likely be his extremely successful expansion of the JBU endowment, upgrade of the facilities and successfully growing the school's enrollment. Under the leadership of Pollard, JBU has seen significant growth through a number of sizable financial gifts. Graduate programs expanded to include the Master of Arts in Teaching, Master of Education, and M.S./MBA in Cybersecurity.

It was announced in early 2010, after receipt of an $8 million anonymous donation, that JBU would construct a new engineering and construction management building. The building was completed in 2011 and named the Balzer Technology Building in honor of the school's former president. Later that year, a JBU engineering student turned successful alumnus and businessman, Bill Berry, provided the financial gift for the Berry Performing Arts Center which was completed in 2011. In 2012, it was announced that the Simmons family, owners of the privately held Simmons Foods located in Siloam Springs, would make a financial gift providing JBU with a new dining and gathering facility. The Simmons Great Hall was completed in mid-2013. The Health Education Building that houses the nursing department was completed in 2016.

== Lifestyle standards ==
In the tradition of some other private Christian universities, John Brown University expects students follow a code of conduct believed to be congruent with biblical principles. Students sign a community covenant stating they will abstain from profanity; plagiarism or theft of copyrighted material; any act that would result in a misdemeanor or felony charge; pornography: extramarital sexual activity or same-sex relationships: sexual, ethnic or racial harassment; tobacco or nicotine use; gambling; and use of alcohol, illegal drugs or other intoxicating substances. Staff and faculty are not required to sign this covenant but must sign a statement of faith and employee expectations which include that "Scripture teaches that sexual intimacy is reserved for marriage and that a Christian marriage is a lifelong commitment between one man and one woman".

John Brown University made national news when it changed its historically held position not to endorse dancing. In December 2006, the school sponsored its own swing-themed dance on campus.

JBU made national news in early 2013 for its yearly toilet paper basketball game. ESPN did a special highlighting "the greatest technical foul in all of sports."

== Campus ==
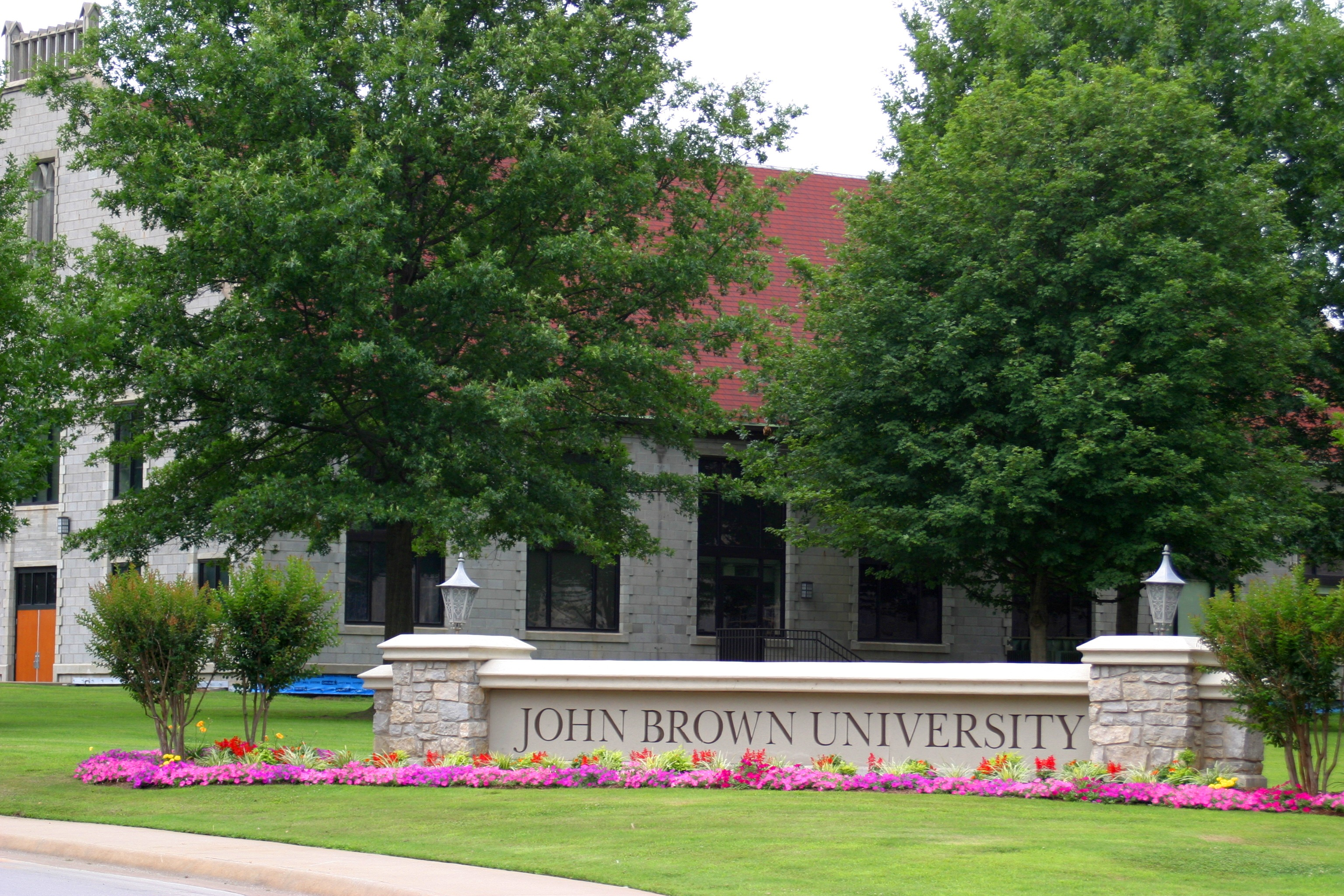
Campus entrance

John Brown University's main campus is located on 200 acres (0.81 km^{2}) in Siloam Springs, Arkansas. The university's most recognizable building, the Cathedral of the Ozarks, was completed in 1957 and, along with the two Windgate Visual Art Buildings composes the Cathedral group. The Cathedral contains a sanctuary for chapel and other assemblies, and the back portion is a three-floor academic building housing the music department and the humanities and social sciences. The entire Cathedral group was recently renovated on the inside and resurfaced with white limestone on the exterior.

Between the Cathedral group and Walker Student Center is the campus's main quad, which is used for recreation and relaxation by students. The student center itself houses a cafe, an open area for studying, bookstore, post office, and classrooms on the second floor. Attached to the student center is the Walker co-ed residence hall with male and female residents living on separate floors. There are three other residence halls on campus as well: J. Alvin Brown, an all-male dormitory and the oldest building on campus which was given a $6 million renovation in 2014; Mayfield, an all-female hall completing a $6 million renovation in 2018, and Hutcheson, a co-ed residence hall. Upperclassman and non-traditional student housing options include campus townhouses and the Northslope Apartments.

Other buildings on campus are the Bill George Arena, Soderquist Business Center, Bell Science Hall, Mabee Learning Resource Center, Chapman Administrative Building, Blood Memorial (Admissions) Building, Berry Performing Arts Center, Balzer Technology Center, CARE Clinic, Simmons Great Hall, Health Education Building, Peer-Andrus Studio & Project Barn and the Walton Lifetime Health Complex.

== Academics ==
Academic rankings

Regional
- U.S. News & World Report: 10

National
- Forbes: 343
- WSJ/College Pulse: 337

John Brown University currently offers over 50 undergraduate majors. In the 2022–2023 and 2023–2024 academic years, the most popular were Nursing (127 students), Psychology (86), Construction Management (83), Mechanical Engineering (74), and Computer Science (71). As a liberal arts college, JBU requires all students to complete a core curriculum including classes in the Bible, English, foreign language, science, the history of Western civilization, mathematics, wellness, psychology, government, and philosophy (Undergraduate Catalog, 2022–2023).

Between 2003 and 2012, JBU rose from eighth to first in U.S. News & World Report rankings for Baccalaureate Colleges (Southern region), and in 2016 was reclassified to Regional Universities (South); it ranked #10 in 2022. JBU's business department claimed first and second place in the Arkansas Governor's Cup in 2007 and swept first through third in 2011. In 2017, the JBU Enactus team won the U.S. National Championship and advanced to the Enactus World Cup in London. The student newspaper, The Threefold Advocate, was named Arkansas's best in 2008 and 2010.

The University Honors Program enrolls around 200 students and offers enriched core courses emphasizing independent research. JBU's libraries hold over 120,000 volumes and provide interlibrary loan and tutoring services. Faculty staffing includes 74 full-time and 113 adjunct instructors, with a student–faculty ratio of 14:1; average class size is 20. The 2024–2025 enrollment stood at 2,340 total students (1,354 traditional undergraduates, 139 online undergraduates, 468 concurrent/dual, and 379 graduate), with 840 students residing on campus.

=== Associated centers ===
John Brown University has two endowed, associated centers: The Center for Healthy Relationships and The Center for Faith and Flourishing.

== Athletics ==
The John Brown (JBU) athletic teams are called the Golden Eagles. The university is a member of the National Association of Intercollegiate Athletics (NAIA), primarily competing in the Sooner Athletic Conference (SAC) since the 1995–96 academic year; which they were a member on a previous stint from 1980–81 to 1982–83. The Golden Eagles previously competed in the Arkansas Intercollegiate Conference (AIC) from 1993–94 to 1994–95; and as an NAIA Independent from 1983–84 to 1992–93.

JBU competes in 11 intercollegiate varsity sports: Men's sports include basketball, cross country, soccer, tennis and track & field; while women's sports include basketball, cross country, soccer, tennis, track & field and volleyball.

=== Basketball ===
On March 22, 2005, the JBU men's basketball team won the 2005 NAIA Division I National Championship. John Brown defeated Azusa Pacific University 65–55 at Municipal Auditorium in Kansas City, Missouri. Each year during the first home game, JBU basketball fans come armed with rolls of toilet paper, which they hurl onto the court after the first JBU basket of the season. This 34-year-old tradition brings in record crowds with approximately 2,000 rolls of toilet paper and lands JBU an automatic technical foul for the season.

=== Golf ===
The JBU varsity men's golf team was originally formed in 1966. The team lasted until 1973, at which time it was cut from the athletic program. The school restarted its men's varsity golf team in the fall of 2008 and remained intact until 2016.

=== Cheerleading ===
JBU began a cheer squad in the fall of 2010. JBU had cheerleading many years ago, but it only counted as a club then.

=== Volleyball ===
The JBU women's volleyball team competes in the Sooner Athletic Conference(NAIA) under longtime head coach Ken Carver, playing home matches at Bill George Arena.

In 2022, the Golden Eagles posted a 22–10 overall record (14–6 in SAC play), finishing third in the conference standings and earning the program's first-ever bid to the NAIA National Tournament following a five-set quarterfinal victory over Oklahoma City University.

The team has also made multiple NAIA National Tournament appearances, including a program-best run to the Round of 16 in 2018, and continues to draw strong student support at home matches.

=== Cross country & track & field ===
Cross country competes in SAC Championships and regional meets.

Track & field was reinstated in 2018. In April 2025, the women's team captured their first-ever SAC Outdoor Championship at Karen Cramer Stadium, edging Oklahoma City by a single point (109–108), and Coach Peter Cunningham was named SAC Women's Outdoor Coach of the Year.

=== Esports ===
JBU announced the addition of varsity esports on November 9, 2022, launching in Fall 2023. The program evolved from a club begun in spring 2021 and competes in the ECAC and the National Esports Collegiate Conference. Teams compete in titles like Rocket League, Overwatch, League of Legends, Super Smash Bros., and chess. The Bynum Theater was converted in fall 2023 into a 20-station esports arena with Alienware PCs, Switch consoles, broadcast equipment, and seating for spectators.

=== Club teams and intramurals ===
The university has club rugby, ultimate frisbee and esports teams for both men and women. The JBU Talons men's club baseball team began play in 2021. These clubs compete against clubs from other universities. To house its club teams, JBU has a rugby pitch and on campus. JBU also has a club ultimate frisbee team. JBU students also participate in a number of intramural sports, from soccer to volleyball to flag football. Many of these events take place on the intramural fields or in the Walton Lifetime Health Complex.

== Notable alumni ==
- Rodney Anderson - former member of the Wyoming House of Representatives
- Dave Armstrong - sportscaster
- Jimmy Driftwood - musician
- Janet Huckabee - wife of former Governor of Arkansas and 2008 Republican presidential candidate Mike Huckabee; completed her undergraduate degree at John Brown University in 2003
- David Leonard - singer-songwriter
- Bill McIlvain, former Wyoming Speaker of the House
- Kendra Moore, American politician
- John Osteen - founder of Lakewood Church
- Rebecca Petty - Republican member of the Arkansas House of Representatives from Rogers; advocate of child crime victims, studied in the Leadership/Ethics program at JBU in 2014
- Carolyn Pollan - 1959 JBU graduate; the longest serving Republican and the longest serving woman member of the Arkansas House of Representatives; member of the JBU trustees
- Jim Sheets - retired Arkansas politician; an administrator at JBU from 1953 to 1969
- Jesse Welles - musician
- Jim Winn - former MLB pitcher

== Notable former faculty ==
- Mike Flynn - radio producer
- Delia Haak - Republican member of the Arkansas House of Representatives for District 91
- Timothy Chad Hutchinson - Republican former member of the Arkansas House of Representatives; adjunct professor of employment law, business law, and corporate governance
- Robin Lundstrum - Republican member of the Arkansas House of Representatives for Benton and Washington counties since 2015; taught at JBU from 1989 to 1998
- Wally Moon - Major League Baseball player
- Mathew Pitsch - adjunct faculty member, Republican member of the Arkansas House of Representatives from Fort Smith
- William M. Runyan - Christian songwriter who composed "Great Is Thy Faithfulness"
- Lavenski Smith - Judge of the U.S. Court of Appeals - Eighth Circuit. Judge Smith was formerly the Chief Judge.
