= Siloam Springs, Arkansas =

City in the United States

- City
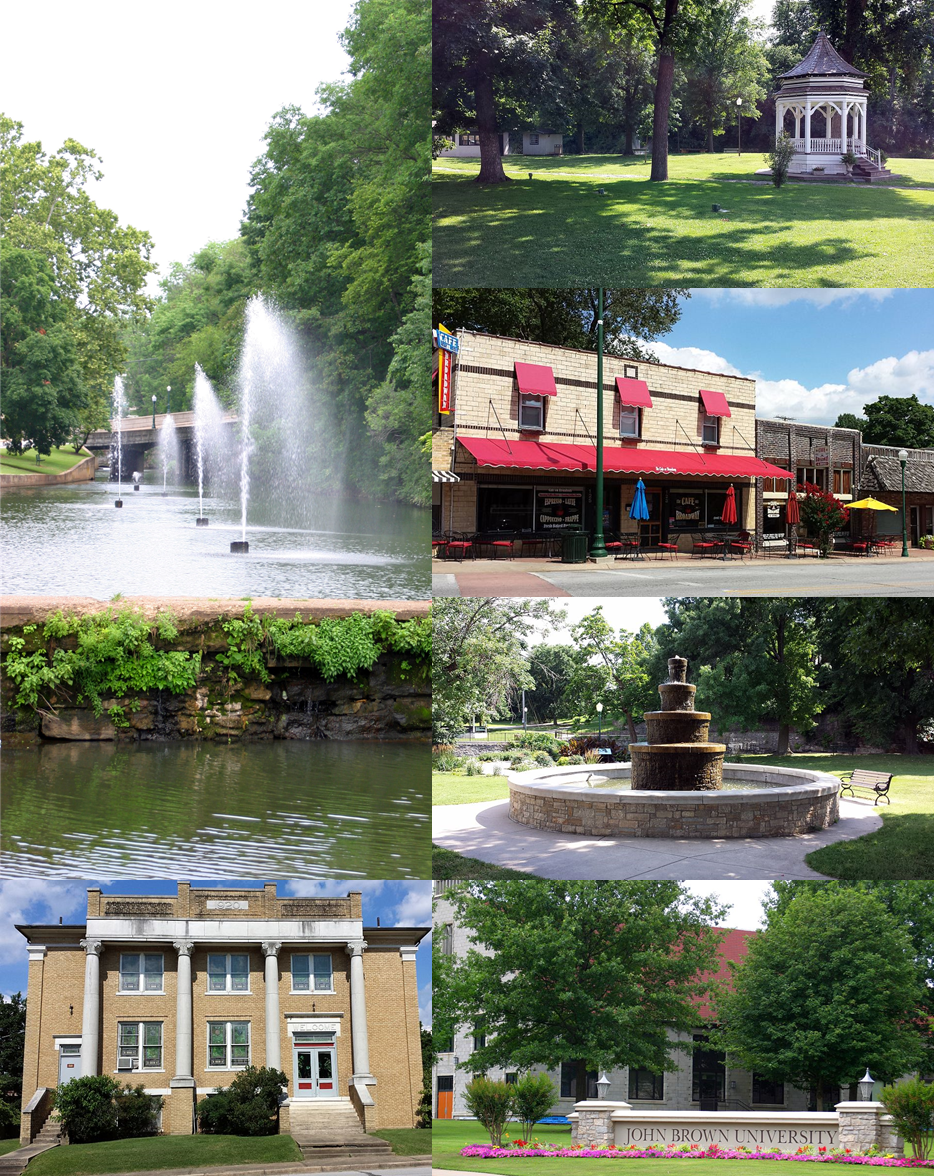
- Clockwise, from top: Gazebo in City Park, Main Street Siloam Springs, fountain in Twin Springs Park, entrance to John Brown University, Sager Creek Arts Center, fountains in Sager Creek

- Flag Logo

- Location of Siloam Springs in Benton County, Arkansas.
- Coordinates: 36°11′0″N 94°32′22″W
- Country: United States
- State: Arkansas
- County: Benton
- Incorporated: December 22, 1881

Government
  - Type: City Administrator
  - Mayor: Judy Nation

Area
  - Total: 11.92 sq mi (30.87 km^{2})
  - Land: 11.75 sq mi (30.43 km^{2})
  - Water: 0.17 sq mi (0.45 km^{2})
- Elevation: 1,132 ft (345 m)

Population (2020)
  - Total: 17,287
  - Estimate (2025): 20,203 ▲
  - Density: 1,471.6/sq mi (568.18/km^{2})
- Time zone: UTC-6 (Central (CST))
  - Summer (DST): UTC-5 (CDT)
- ZIP code: 72761
- Area code: 479
- FIPS code: 05-64370
- GNIS feature ID: 0078364
- Website: www.siloamsprings.gov

Siloam Springs is a city in Benton County, Arkansas, United States, and located on the western edge of the Northwest Arkansas metropolitan area. As of the 2020 census, the population of the city was 17,287. The community was founded in 1882 and was characterized by the purported healing powers of the spring water feeding Sager Creek and trading with nearby Native American tribes. The city shares a border on the Arkansas–Oklahoma state line with the city of West Siloam Springs, Oklahoma, which is within the Cherokee Nation territory. It is home of John Brown University.

== History ==
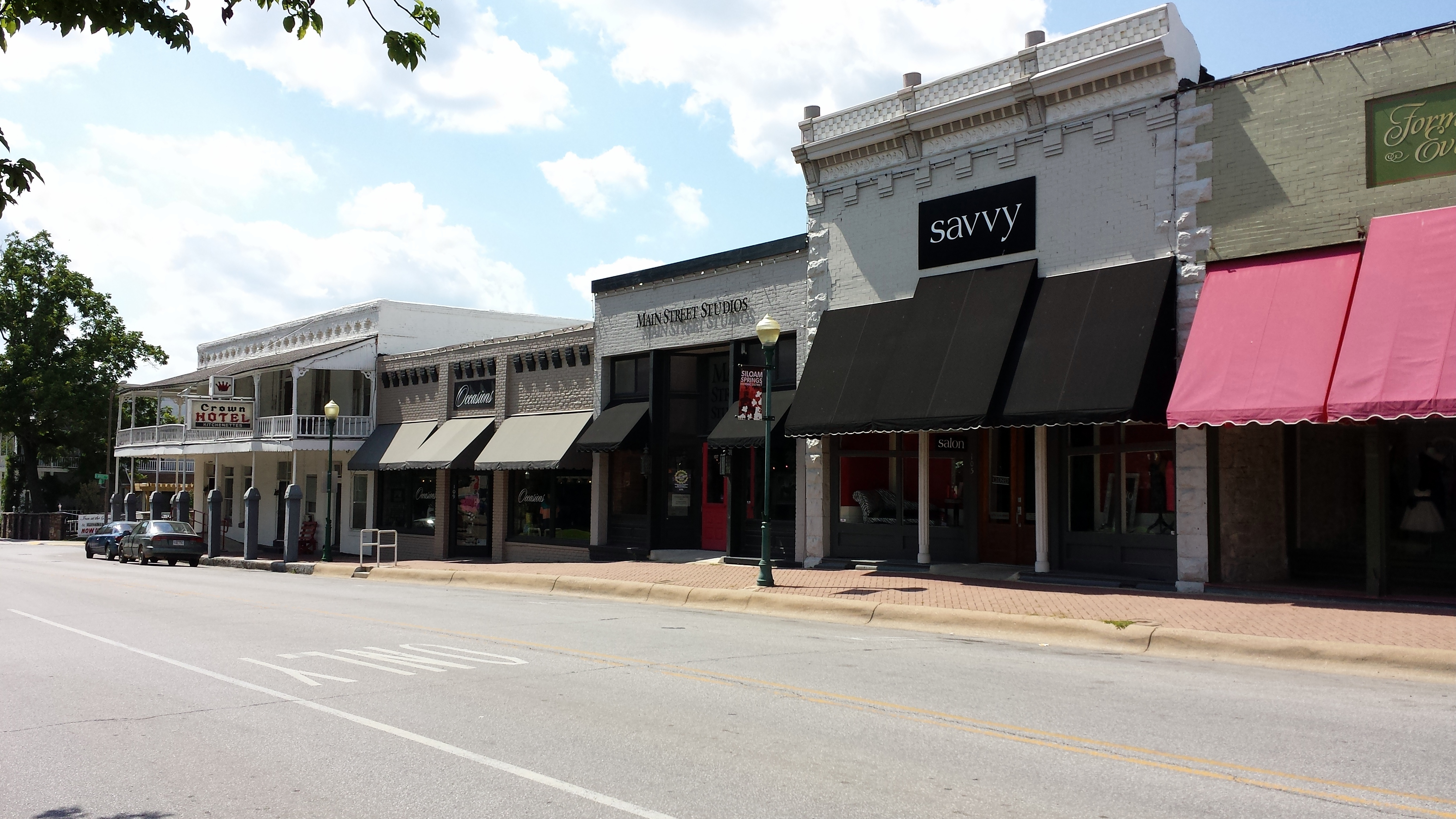
The historic downtown of Siloam Springs was first founded as a resort town surrounding the healing waters of the springs

Osage Indians were the known first inhabitants of the area. Siloam Springs' first white settlers were of German and Scots-Irish origin. Simon Sager is considered the founder of the town, then known as Hico.

In 2012, the city was named one of the 20 best small towns in America by Smithsonian magazine.

== Geography ==
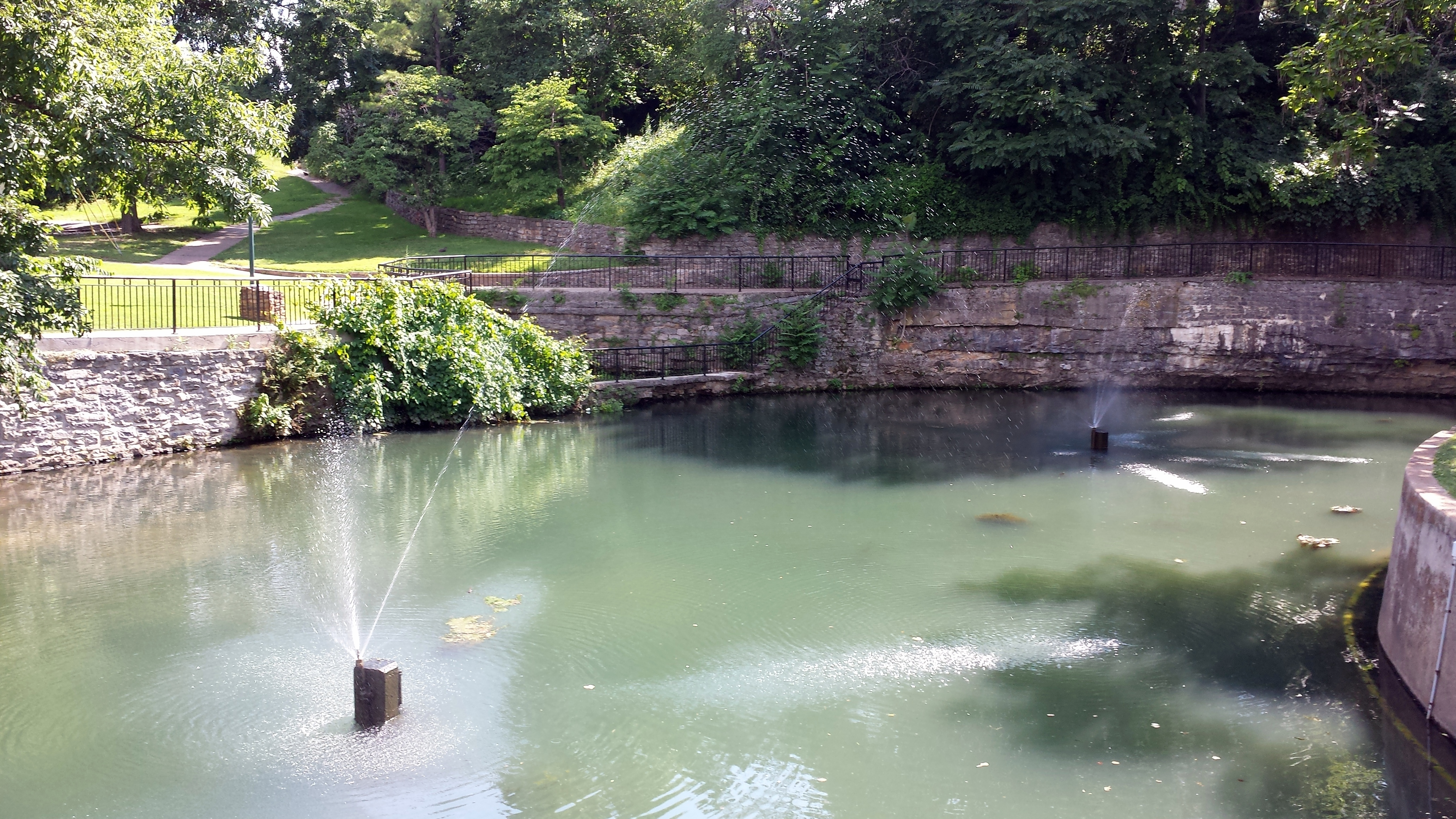
Sager Creek

The area is located in the Mid-South region of the country where the southern plains meet the Ozark Mountains. The city sits atop a plateau with many dogwood trees growing across the landscape.

A perennial creek, named after the founder, Sager Creek, flows through the downtown area.

According to the United States Census Bureau, the city has a total area of 11.2 square miles (28.9 km^{2}), of which 11.1 square miles (28.7 km^{2}) is land and 0.077 square miles (0.2 km^{2}), or 0.71%, is water.

=== Metropolitan area ===
The Fayetteville–Springdale–Rogers Metropolitan Area consists of three Arkansas counties: Benton, Madison, and Washington, and McDonald County, Missouri. The area had a population of 347,045 at the 2000 census which had increased to 463,204 by the 2010 Census (an increase of 33.47 percent). Siloam Springs is at the extreme western edge of this area, connected to the principal cities by Highway 412.

=== Climate ===
The climate in this area is characterized by hot, humid summers and generally mild to cool winters. According to the Köppen Climate Classification system, Siloam Springs has a humid subtropical climate, abbreviated "Cfa" on climate maps.

July is the hottest month of the year, with an average high of 89.1 °F (31.7 °C) and an average low of 68.6 °F (20.3 °C). Temperatures above 100 °F (37.8 °C) are rare but not uncommon, occurring on average twice a year. January is the coldest month with an average high of 44.3 °F (6.8 °C) and an average low of 24.2 °F (−4.3 °C). Highs below 32 °F (0.0 °C) occur on average thirteen times a year, with 2.2 nights per year dropping below 0 °F (−17.8 °C). The city's highest temperature was 111 °F (43.9 °C), recorded on July 14, 1954. The lowest temperature recorded was −24 °F (−31.1 °C), on February 12, 1899.

Precipitation is weakly seasonal, with a bimodal pattern: wet seasons in the spring and fall, and relatively drier summers and winters, but some rain in all months. The spring wet season is more pronounced than fall, with the highest rainfall in May. This differs slightly from the climate in central Arkansas, where the fall wet season is more comparable to spring.

Climate data for Siloam Springs, Arkansas (1981–2010 normals)
Month	Jan	Feb	Mar	Apr	May	Jun	Jul	Aug	Sep	Oct	Nov	Dec	Year
Record high °F (°C)	77 (25)	83 (28)	90 (32)	91 (33)	92 (33)	103 (39)	111 (44)	109 (43)	102 (39)	96 (36)	83 (28)	79 (26)	111 (44)
Mean daily maximum °F (°C)	45 (7)	51 (11)	59 (15)	69 (21)	76 (24)	84 (29)	89 (32)	89 (32)	81 (27)	71 (22)	57 (14)	48 (9)	68 (20)
Mean daily minimum °F (°C)	23 (−5)	28 (−2)	36 (2)	44 (7)	53 (12)	62 (17)	67 (19)	66 (19)	59 (15)	47 (8)	36 (2)	27 (−3)	46 (8)
Record low °F (°C)	−12 (−24)	−14 (−26)	−7 (−22)	20 (−7)	30 (−1)	43 (6)	46 (8)	42 (6)	31 (−1)	20 (−7)	5 (−15)	−8 (−22)	−14 (−26)
Average precipitation inches (mm)	2.27 (58)	2.20 (56)	4.32 (110)	4.31 (109)	5.20 (132)	4.84 (123)	3.54 (90)	3.35 (85)	5.05 (128)	3.68 (93)	4.82 (122)	3.42 (87)	47 (1,193)
Average snowfall inches (cm)	3.3 (8.4)	1.6 (4.1)	1.9 (4.8)	0 (0)	0 (0)	0 (0)	0 (0)	0 (0)	0 (0)	0.1 (0.25)	0.2 (0.51)	2.0 (5.1)	9.1 (23.16)
Source: The Weather Channel

== Demographics ==
Historical population
Census	Pop.	Note	%±
1880	95		—
1890	821		764.2%
1900	1,748		112.9%
1910	2,405		37.6%
1920	2,569		6.8%
1930	2,378		−7.4%
1940	2,764		16.2%
1950	3,270		18.3%
1960	3,953		20.9%
1970	6,009		52.0%
1980	7,940		32.1%
1990	8,151		2.7%
2000	10,843		33.0%
2010	15,039		38.7%
2020	17,287		14.9%
2025 (est.)	20,203	▲	16.9%
U.S. Decennial Census

=== 2020 census ===
As of the 2020 census, Siloam Springs had a population of 17,287. The median age was 30.4 years. 27.3% of residents were under the age of 18 and 12.1% were 65 years of age or older. For every 100 females, there were 93.0 males, and for every 100 females age 18 and over, there were 89.9 males age 18 and over.

There were 5,964 households in Siloam Springs, including 3,980 families. Of all households, 39.2% had children under the age of 18 living in them, 49.1% were married-couple households, 16.2% had a male householder and no spouse or partner present, and 27.1% had a female householder and no spouse or partner present. About 24.3% of all households were made up of individuals, and 9.0% had someone living alone who was 65 years of age or older.

96.7% of residents lived in urban areas, while 3.3% lived in rural areas.

There were 6,399 housing units, of which 6.8% were vacant. The homeowner vacancy rate was 2.5%, and the rental vacancy rate was 6.4%.

Siloam Springs racial composition
Race	Number	Percentage
White (non-Hispanic)	10,175	58.86%
Black or African American (non-Hispanic)	184	1.06%
Native American	737	4.26%
Asian	345	2.0%
Pacific Islander	32	0.19%
Other/Mixed	1,477	8.54%
Hispanic or Latino	4,337	25.09%

=== 2010 census ===
As of the census of 2010, there were 15,039 people in 5,138 households with 93.3% of the population in households. The racial and ethnic composition of the population was 76% non-Hispanic white, 0.8% black, 4.6% Native American, 1.6% Asian, 0.2% non-Hispanic reporting some other race, 5.0% from two or more races and 20.8% Hispanic or Latino.

=== 2000 census ===
At the 2000 census, there were 2,647 families residing in the city. The population density was 1,027.2 inhabitants per square mile (396.6/km^{2}). There were 4,223 housing units at an average density of 400.1 per square mile (154.5/km^{2}). The racial makeup of the city was 85.22% White, 0.49% Black or African American, 4.29% Native American, 0.83% Asian, 0.08% Pacific Islander, 5.67% from other races, and 3.42% from two or more races. 14.00% of the population were Hispanic or Latino of any race.

There were 3,894 households, out of which 34.8% had children under the age of 18 living with them, 53.8% were married couples living together, 10.6% had a female householder with no husband present, and 32.0% were non-families. 26.9% of all households were made up of individuals, and 11.9% had someone living alone who was 65 years of age or older. The average household size was 2.57 and the average family size was 3.11.

Income for a household in the city was $34,513, and the median income for a family was $41,153. Males had a median income of $27,339 versus $21,451 for females. The per capita income for the city was $16,047. About 9.5% of families and 12.5% of the population were below the poverty line, including 17.6% of those under age 18 and 8.6% of those age 65 or over.

=== Religion ===
As of 2009, there were 52 churches that called Siloam Springs home by address. There are reports that Siloam Springs has a record for most number churches per capita, and while the ratio is higher than average, it has never been verified through reliable documentation. (Despite the large number of churches, the town does contain a small atheist/non-religious community.)

=== Economy ===
Major employers in Siloam Springs include Simmons Foods, Gates Corporation, La-Z-Boy, DaySpring (a subsidiary of Hallmark Cards), Cobb-Vantress, and John Brown University.

== Arts and culture ==
=== Annual cultural events ===
Event	Time of year	Attendance (approx.)
Dogwood Festival	April (last weekend)	30,000
Homegrown Festival	October	3,000
Siloam Springs Rodeo	June	10,000
Light Up Siloam Christmas Parade	December (first Saturday)	6,500
City Fireworks Presentation	July 4	6,000
Northwest Arkansas Marching Band Invitational	October	2,500
JBU Candlelight Christmas Concerts	December	3,000
JBU Homecoming	October	1,000
Siloam Springs Music Games (Marching Band Competition)	July	2,000
Siloam Springs Center for the Arts	All year	10,000 per year

== Government ==
Siloam Springs has a city administrator form of government. The government body consists of the mayor, board of directors and district judge. All positions are chosen by election. The other officials and commissioners are appointed with Board approval.

== Education ==
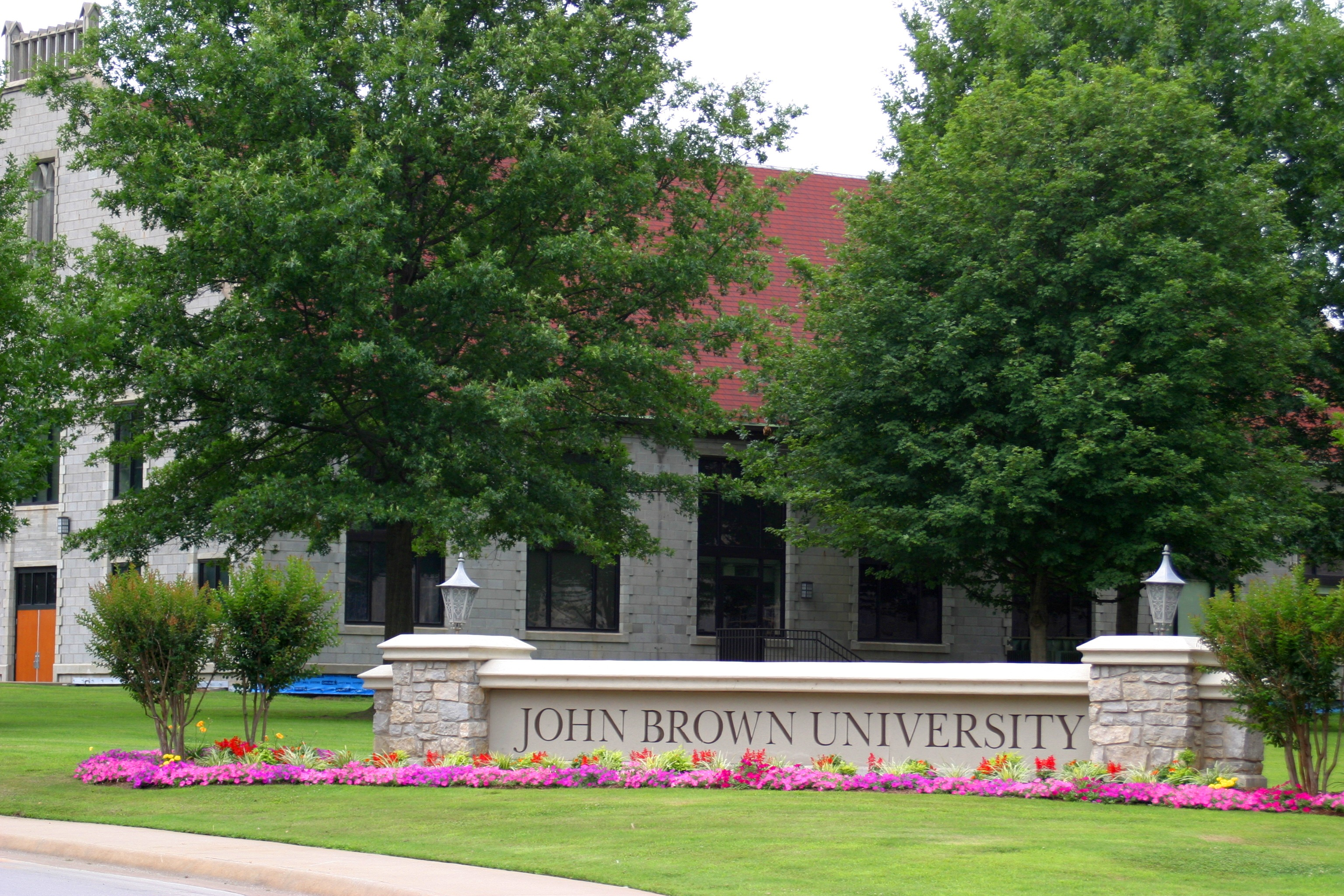
John Brown University

John Brown University is in Siloam Springs.

All of Siloam Springs is within the Siloam Springs School District, which operates:

- Siloam Springs High School (grades 9–12)
- Siloam Springs Middle School (grades 7–8)
- Siloam Springs Intermediate School (grades 5–6)
- Southside Elementary School (grades 3–4)
- Allen Elementary School (grades 1 & 2)
- Northside Elementary School (grades Pre-K & K)
- Siloam Springs Virtual Academy (grades K–12)

== Infrastructure ==
=== Transportation ===
Siloam Springs traffic is primarily served by US 412 for east–west travel, connecting the city to Tulsa, Oklahoma, to the west via the Cherokee Turnpike and to Bentonville, Fayetteville, and Springdale, Arkansas, to the east. US 59 runs south from West Siloam Springs to Stilwell and Sallisaw, Oklahoma, while Arkansas 59 runs north to Gravette and south to Van Buren and Fort Smith, Arkansas. Within the city, major routes include Cheri Whitlock Drive, Lincoln Street, Main Street, Mount Olive Street, and University Street.

Smith Field, located east of town, serves small business jets as well as double- and single-engine aircraft. It serves exclusively general aviation operations.

Commercial air transportation is available from Northwest Arkansas Regional Airport, about 21 miles (34 km) to the east-northeast.

=== Utilities ===
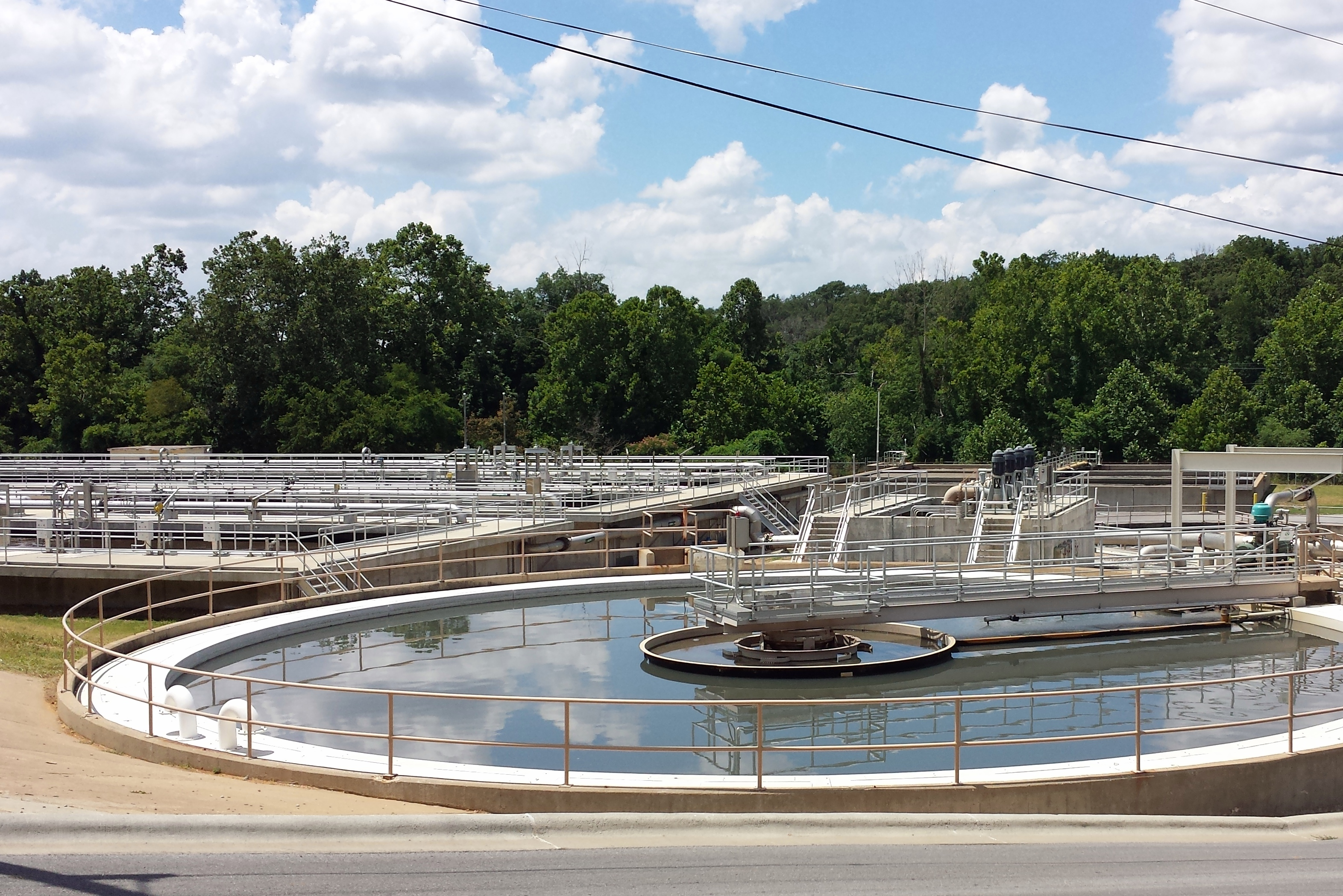
Primary clarifier (foreground) and aeration basins (background) at Siloam Springs Wastewater Treatment Plant

The city's primary water source is the Illinois River, although some water is purchased from Benton - Washington Regional Public Water Authority, whose source is Beaver Lake. The water is treated with chlorine, and the by-products of this chlorination process are kept compliant with the Arkansas Department of Health standards. Fluoride is added to supplement the naturally occurring amount present prior to treatment.

Wastewater is treated at the Siloam Springs Wastewater Treatment Plant (SSWWTP). Since effluent is discharged into a tributary of the Illinois, the plant's effluent is required to meet the treatment standards of both Arkansas and Oklahoma. The phosphorus load of the Illinois has been subject of controversy in the area, even reaching the United States Supreme Court in 1992. The Environmental Protection Agency (EPA) has classified the Illinois as Section 303(d) of the Clean Water Act, listing it as an "impaired and threatened water" due to the high phosphorus loads. As a result of the applicable strict phosphorus effluent regulations, SSWWTP upgraded its system in 2011. The upgrades also increased capacity 25% to 5.5 million gallons per day (MGD) (14,474 liters per hour). Although presently a traditional biological nutrient removal (BNR) plant capable of meeting the interim phosphorus limit, pilot tests have proven a chemical nutrient removal (CNR) and membrane biological reactor combination to be effective well below the possible future permit limit. However, due to the high cost, these phases have been delayed. Currently, a 3-year study is being conducted to determine the background phosphorus level in the Illinois. The future effluent limits will likely be written following the conclusion of the study. An EPA total maximum daily load (TMDL) study in the watershed is also ongoing.

== Notable people ==
- Duncan Baird, Republican politician from District 96 in Benton County, graduated from Siloam Springs High School
- Jonathan Barnett, Republican politician from District 87 in Benton and Washington counties
- Preston Bynum, a lobbyist in Little Rock, served as the state representative from Siloam Springs from 1969 to 1980
- Mike Flynn, radio personality, hosts the NPR program The Folk Sampler
- Alice Ghostley, actress, spent a number of years in Siloam Springs as a youth
- Sawyer Hill, American musician
- Sleepy LaBeef – American musician (1935–2019)
- Carman Griffin "Max" Maxwell, known professionally as C. G. Maxwell, was an American animator and voice actor.
- Jim Winn, Major League Baseball pitcher, went to John Brown University in Siloam Springs
- Jonathan Earl Woods, Republican politician, served as former member of both houses of the Arkansas General Assembly

== See also ==
- Arkansas Highway 99, a former highway designation in Siloam Springs
