= NFL on television in the 1950s =

The NFL, along with boxing and professional wrestling (before the latter publicly became known as a staged sport), was a pioneer of sports broadcasting during a time when baseball and college football were more popular than professional football. Due to the NFL understanding television at an earlier time, they were able to surpass Major League Baseball in the 1960s as the most popular sport in the United States.

NBC's coverage of the National Football League (which has aired under numerous program titles and formats) actually goes back to the beginnings of the network's relationship with the league in 1939, when its New York City flagship station, then known as W2XBS (now WNBC) aired the first televised professional football game between the Philadelphia Eagles and the now-defunct Brooklyn Dodgers football team. Even before this, in 1934, NBC Radio's Blue Network had carried the Detroit Lions' inaugural Thanksgiving game nationwide.

Regular broadcasts of games began after World War II and the first NFL championship to be televised was the 1948 match between the Eagles and Cardinals.

== Year-by-year breakdown ==
=== 1950 ===
In 1950, the Los Angeles Rams and the Washington Redskins became the first NFL teams to have all of their games—home and away—televised. In the same year, other teams made deals to have selected games telecast. The DuMont Network then paid a rights fee of US$75,000 to broadcast the 1951 NFL Championship Game across the entire nation.

=== 1951 ===
Locally and regionally televised games were broadcast as early as 1939, but on December 23, 1951, DuMont televised the first ever live, coast-to-coast professional football game, the NFL Championship Game between the Los Angeles Rams and Cleveland Browns. DuMont paid $75,000 for the rights to broadcast the game.

From the 1951 thru the 1964 seasons, the Pro Bowl television rightsholders were the Los Angeles Newspaper Charities, as opposed to the National Football League. Since the 1965 season, the NFL has owned the telecast rights.

=== 1952 ===
In 1952, DuMont only aired New York Giants games before moving to a more national scope the following season.

=== 1953 ===
During the 1953 and 1954 seasons, DuMont broadcast Saturday night NFL games. It was the first time that National Football League games were televised live, coast-to-coast, in prime time, for the entire season. This predated Monday Night Football on ABC by 17 years. Several of the games in 1953 and 1954 originated in New York (Giants), Pittsburgh (Steelers), or Washington (Redskins). (All three of these cities had DuMont O&Os.)

In 1953, DuMont televised a Thanksgiving NFL game between the Detroit Lions and the Green Bay Packers.

=== 1954 ===
DuMont was nominated for Emmy Awards for its coverage of the 1953 and 1954 seasons but did not win.

DuMont proved to be a less than ideal choice for a national broadcaster. The network had only eighteen primary affiliates in 1954, dwarfed by the 120 available to NBC (although a number of ABC, CBS, and NBC affiliates that had DuMont "secondary" affiliations did carry some NFL games, mainly on Sunday afternoons). Coverage of Canadian football's "Big Four" was more readily available on NBC than NFL games were in most markets on DuMont.

=== 1955 ===
In January 1955, DuMont obtained rights from the Los Angeles Newspaper Charities to cover the Pro Bowl only one week before the game date. As they had trouble lining up affiliates to cover the game on such short notice, the telecast was cancelled.

By 1955, the DuMont network was beginning to crumble. For instance, in 1955, NBC replaced DuMont as the network for the NFL Championship Game, paying a rights fee of $100,000. ABC acquired the rights to the Thanksgiving game. Meanwhile, most teams (sans the Giants, Eagles and Steelers, who received regionalized coverage from DuMont) were left to fend for themselves in terms of TV coverage.

DuMont ceased most entertainment programs (and a nightly newscast) in early April 1955. DuMont still broadcast some sports events (a Monday-night boxing show and the 1955 NFL season) until either August 1956, or Thanksgiving 1957. Prior to the 1956 NFL season, DuMont sold its broadcast rights to CBS; for DuMont's last broadcast in 1957, a high school football state championship, it borrowed Chris Schenkel, CBS's announcer for New York Giants broadcasts at the time.

By 1955, NBC became the television home to the NFL Championship Game, the precursor to the Super Bowl, paying US$100,000 to the league for the rights. The network had taken over the broadcast rights from the DuMont Television Network, which (as previously mentioned) had struggled to give the league a national audience (NBC's coverage of proto-Canadian Football League games from the year prior was more widely available at the time) and was on the brink of failure; the NFL's associations with NBC (as well as with CBS) proved to be a boost to the league's popularity.

=== 1956 ===
In August 1956, the DuMont Television Network, the NFL's primary television partner, ended network operations after years of decline. DuMont had already sold the rights to the NFL Championship to NBC in 1955, and when DuMont ended its regular season coverage, CBS acquired the rights.

CBS' coverage began on September 30, 1956 (the first regular season broadcast was a game between the visiting Washington Redskins against the Pittsburgh Steelers), before the 1970 AFL–NFL merger. Prior to 1968, CBS had an assigned crew for each NFL team. As a result, CBS became the first network to broadcast some NFL regular season games to selected television markets across the country. From 1970 until the end of the 1993 season, when Fox won the broadcast television contract to that particular conference, CBS aired NFL games from the National Football Conference. Since 1975, game coverage has been preceded by pre-game show The NFL Today, which features game previews, extensive analysis and interviews.

CBS's first attempts to broadcast the NFL on television were notable for there being no broadcasting contract with the league as a whole. Instead, CBS had to strike deals with individual teams to broadcast games into the teams' own markets, many of which CBS had purchased from the moribund DuMont Television Network. Often the games would be broadcast with "split audio" – that is, a game between two franchises would have the same picture in both teams' "networks" (the visiting team's home city and affiliates of the home team's "network" beyond a 75-mile radius of the home team's television market). Each team's "network" had different announcers (usually those working in their home markets).

The New York Giants in particular were carried on the DuMont network, then CBS (airing locally on WCBS-TV, channel 2) in the early days of the NFL of the league's television broadcasts, when home games were blacked out within a 75-mile radius of New York City. Chris Schenkel was their play-by-play announcer in that early era when each team was assigned its own network voice on its regional telecasts. At the time, there were few if any true national telecasts until the NFL championship game, which was carried by NBC. Schenkel was joined by Jim McKay, later Johnny Lujack through the 1950s and the early 1960s. As Giants players retired to the broadcast booth in the early and 1960s, first Pat Summerall, then Frank Gifford took the color analyst slot next to Schenkel. As the 1970 merger of the NFL and AFL approached, CBS moved to a more generic announcer approach while Schenkel left to join ABC Sports.

The Week 5 game between New York and Philadelphia in 1956 was a national telecast with the Giants crew (Chris Schenkel and Gene Kirby) calling the shots. The Week 13 game between the Washington Redskins and Baltimore Colts in 1956 was also a national telecast with the Washington voices (Arch McDonald and Jim Gibbons) calling the game. The 1957 Pro Bowl was offered to NBC, then CBS. Both declined to carry the game. ABC was then offered to televise and accepted, but could not gain enough clearance of affiliates in time to make it a profitable venture. Thus they also dropped out and the game was not televised.

=== 1957 ===
Both NBC and CBS passed on the rights to the 1957 Pro Bowl. ABC apparently considered televising the game, but could not gain enough clearance of affiliates to make a telecast feasible. So for the third straight year, there was no telecast.

When CBS televised a Week 1 game between the Bears and Green Bay Packers in 1957, it not only served as a rare occurrence of an away game shown on the Chicago CBS network, but a regular season NFL telecast shown in Chicago. This particular game (called by Red Grange and Bill Fay for the Chicago market and Ray Scott and Johnny Lujack for the Green Bay market) was the first official game ever played in the new City Stadium, which we now know as Lambeau Field. Also in Week 1 of the 1957 season, the Philadelphia-Los Angeles game not televised, so the Eagles crew of Byrum Saam and Jack Whitaker worked the Detroit-Baltimore game back to the Philadelphia region. Meanwhile, Jim McKay worked with Chris Schenkel for that week's New York-Cleveland game.

Per the October 17, 1957 issue of Sports Illustrated, the Redskins-Cardinals game in Week 2 of the 1957 season was a virtual national telecast, seen everywhere except the West Coast and the Green Bay and Detroit networks. Arch McDonald and Jim Gibbons called the game for the Washington market while Joe Boland and Joe Foss called it for the Chicago market. Also per the November 4, 1957 issue of Sports Illustrated, the Chicago Bears-Los Angeles game was listed as not being televised.

For the Thanksgiving Day game in 1957 between Green Bay and Detroit, Joe Boland and Bob Kelley worked the national audio feed. Meanwhile, Ray Scott and Johnny Lujack called the game for the Green Bay market and Van Patrick, Bob Reynolds and Les Bingaman called it for the Detroit market. One week later, the New York-Pittsburgh game was a national telecast, simply using the Giants on-air talent (Chris Schenkel and Jim McKay). The Week 13 game between Pittsburgh and the Chicago Cardinals was originally scheduled to be televised at least regionally, but with nothing at stake for this game and with the Detroit-San Francisco Western tiebreaker set for later in the day, this game was dropped from telecast.

=== 1958 ===
For 1958, Red Grange partnered with Bill Fay to do play-by-play on the CBS Chicago football network when the Bears were home. At this point, the Cleveland Browns were still a part of the syndicated Sports Network outside of the Cleveland region, which consisted of non-CBS affiliates. Leon Hart would join the Detroit Lions broadcast crew (consisting of Van Patrick and Bob Reynolds) for 1958. The Lions also simulcast the team of Patrick and Reynolds for radio and the CBS-TV Lions network.

Per the November 3, 1958 issue of Sports Illustrated the Chicago Bears-Los Angeles game in Week 6 was not televised. For that year's Thanksgiving Day game between Green Bay and Detroit, three crews were used (a national feed and local audio feeds for the Green Bay and Detroit networks). On the coast-to-coast audio, Joe Boland and Chris Schenkel split play-by-play duties. Meanwhile, Ray Scott and George Connor called the game for the Green Bay market while Van Patrick, Bob Reynolds, and Leon Hart called the game for the Detroit market. The 1958 tiebreaker game between Cleveland and New York featured Chris Schenkel and Ken Coleman splitting a half of play-by-play with Johnny Lujack as color throughout.

The 1958 NFL Championship Game, played at Yankee Stadium, between the Baltimore Colts and the New York Giants went into sudden death overtime. This game, since known as the "Greatest Game Ever Played", was seen by many throughout the country and is credited with increasing the popularity of professional football in the late 1950s and early 1960s.

=== 1959 ===
From 1956 to 1959, the Baltimore Colts, Pittsburgh Steelers and Philadelphia Eagles only had their away games telecast on CBS. When these three played at home, there was no need for the usage of split audio. Instead, the away team's telecasts were produced in a simple singular audio-video feed. In 1959, 1960 and 1961, NBC had the rights to televise Colts and Steelers home games. While the game broadcasts were blacked out (as per NFL policy) in those cities, they were available to other NBC-affiliated stations.

The Chicago Bears and Chicago Cardinals only produced home telecasts for their vast network. Because of this, if the Bears played the Colts in Baltimore or the Cardinals visited Forbes Field to play the Steelers during this period, it was likely that the games were not televised by CBS (although from 1959 to 1961, they might have been shown by NBC). Meanwhile, the Cleveland Browns had their own network, part of Sports Network Incorporated (SNI) and Carling Beer.

By 1959, big-market teams such as the Bears and Giants had all their games televised, but small-market ones like the Packers and 49ers still did not. Upon becoming NFL commissioner, Pete Rozelle worked to ensure that every team got all its games on TV.

CBS had at least 11 teams under contract. The Cleveland Browns were still pretty much, the lone exception. CBS' broadcast of the New York-Los Angeles game (called by Chris Schenkel and Johnny Lujack) in Week 1, was a national telecast that was carried live. CBS would not dare preempt the ratings powerhouse that was Gunsmoke so the game started at approximately 11:15 p.m. Eastern Time. Meanwhile, the huge Chicago network carried only home games of the Cardinals and Bears. Thus Week 1's Bears-Packers game (called by Ray Scott and Tony Canadeo) was seen only on the Packers network (subject to blackout) and the Redskins-Cardinals game (called by Jim Gibbons and Eddie Gallaher for the Washington market and Joe Boland and Paul Christman for the Chicago market) was seen on the CBS Chicago network, which may have reached 40% of the country. The Eagles crew of Byrum Saam and Jack Whitaker worked that week's Detroit-Baltimore game for the New York and Philadelphia CBS networks. Finally, the Philadelphia-San Francisco game was seen only on the CBS Pacific network, thus only the 49ers commentators (Bob Fouts and Gordy Soltau) were heard.

On October 11, 1959 during Week 3, NFL Commissioner Bert Bell, while in the stands for the Pittsburgh-Philadelphia game (with Joe Tucker on commentary), suffered a fatal heart attack. In Week 6 of the 1959 season, the full CBS Pacific network was tuned into the Chicago Bears-Los Angeles game (called by Bob Kelley and Elroy Hirsch). Due to the quirk that the Eagles did not televise home games and the Cardinals did not televise away games on their respective networks in 1959, the Philadelphia-Chicago Cardinals game in Week 8 was by design, not televised.

CBS once again used three separate audio feeds for the Thanksgiving Day game in 1959. Joe Boland and Paul Christman, the Cardinals crew, worked the coast-to-coast feed, Ray Scott and Tony Canadeo were heard on the CBS Packers network, and Van Patrick and Bob Reynolds were used for the Lions CBS network (subject to blackout). The Detroit network also plugged into Week 10's San Francisco-Cleveland game (called by Bob Fouts and Gordy Soltau on CBS and Ken Coleman and Jimmy Dudley on Cleveland's syndicated network). The following week, the Packers' CBS network plugged into Pittsburgh-Chicago Bears game (called by Joe Tucker for the Pittsburgh market and Red Grange and George Connor for the Chicago market) while the Colts' CBS network plugged into Cleveland-New York game (called by Chris Schenkel and Johnny Lujack for CBS).

For the final week of the 1959 regular season, the Packers' CBS network (again composed of Ray Scott and Tony Canadeo) plugged into Detroit-Chicago bears match-up (called by Van Patrick and Bob Reynolds for the Detroit market and Red Grange and George Connor for the Chicago market) while the Colts' CBS network plugged into New York-Washington game (called by Chris Schenkel and Johnny Lujack for the New York market and by Jim Gibbons and Eddie Gallaher for the Washington market).

== See also ==
- NFL on television
- History of the NFL on television
- List of NFL Championship Game broadcasters
