= List of DuMont Television Network affiliates =

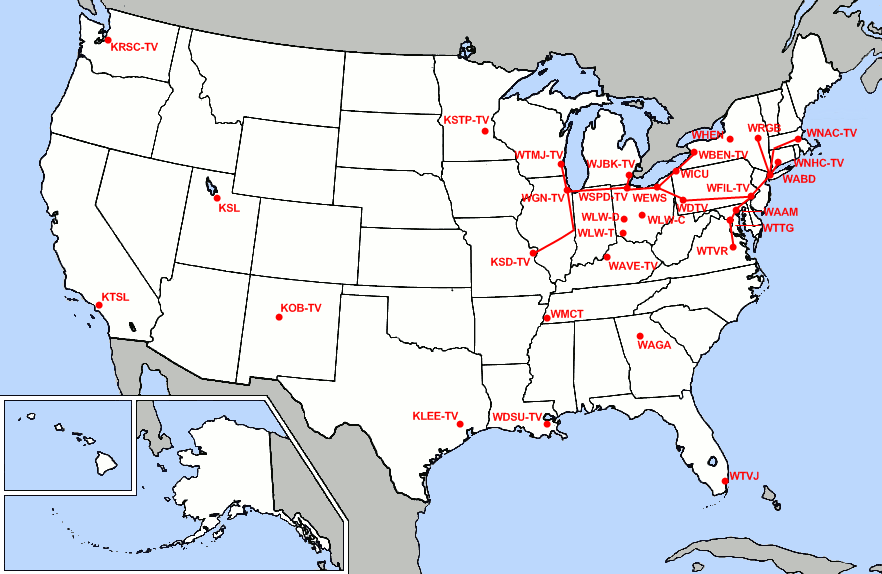
Map of affiliates for the DuMont Television Network, 1949

This is a partial list of affiliates of the DuMont Television Network, which operated in the United States from 1946 to 1955. In 1949, DuMont had 32 affiliates that covered 99.7 percent of the country's available television audience. By 1953, DuMont was affiliated with 126 stations, which grew to around 200 stations in 1954, the network's peak. The network owned three stations: WABD in New York City, WTTG in Washington, D.C., and WDTV in Pittsburgh; the Federal Communications Commission (FCC) also regarded two stations owned by minority owner Paramount Pictures—KTLA in Los Angeles and WBKB in Chicago—as network-owned, despite KTLA leaving the network entirely in 1948 and WBKB never having carried a DuMont program. DuMont also owned an early UHF station, KCTY in Kansas City, Missouri, for one month in 1954 before closing it. From 1950 to 1951, DuMont also operated KE2XDR, an experimental station to further study color television.

No definitive list of affiliated stations from 1946 to 1955 exists, and many sources contradict one another. Due to a lack of local stations in most media markets, most DuMont affiliates were also affiliates of NBC, CBS or ABC, or in some cases, all of the above. This problem was heightened by the FCC imposing a freeze on any new television station permits in 1948. The AT&T Bell System nationwide coaxial cable network was in construction throughout much of DuMont's existence, thus, many affiliates carried programming prerecorded via kinescope. By 1952, this cable network was still incomplete; a map of affiliates in The Hollywood Reporter's 1952 Production Encyclopedia showed affiliates in Seattle, Miami, Dallas–Fort Worth and New Orleans were still unconnected. Other affiliates in small markets were fully dependent on affiliates in larger markets via microwave relay; for example, KDZA-TV in Pueblo, Colorado, relied on KFEL-TV in Denver for DuMont programming. DuMont's advertising revenues depended on being able to be viewed nationwide. As a result, the company made affiliation agreements which have been described as "a crazy patchwork of deals".

Few stations carried the entire DuMont lineup. Life Is Worth Living was DuMont's most popular show with 172 affiliates clearing it when the network closed in 1955; by contrast, Life Begins at Eighty aired over 37 stations, Chance of a Lifetime on 27 stations, and Studio 57 on only four. Affiliates also fed sports coverage to the network: for example, Cleveland, Ohio, affiliate WXEL produced Cleveland Browns games for the network's NFL coverage. In the network's later years, DuMont's affiliates consisted largely of poorly-watched UHF stations that signed on from 1953 onward and were ill-equipped to compete with established VHF stations. One such UHF station, WITV in Fort Lauderdale, Florida, was on paper a primary ABC and DuMont affiliate, but WTVJ in Miami retained "first call" option on programs from both networks. By 1955, only five percent of DuMont's cable and microwave relay network was utilized, with the majority of their business being transcriptions.

The end dates listed here are somewhat tentative and largely sourced from either the Spring 1955 Television Factbook or individual station articles. In April 1955, the network announced all scripted programming would be dropped by September and that it would only supply news, sports and live events to affiliates, effectively ending normal operations. The relay network was retained but only for affiliates on the East Coast. No mention of the network—or that it would even continue to function as one—was made when DuMont Laboratories announced the spin-off of DuMont Broadcasting later in the year, consisting of WABD and WTTG. From September 1955 onward, DuMont's sole remaining program was Boxing from St. Nicholas Arena; by August 1956, only 37 stations carried Boxing, 17 of them live. Boxing transitioned to being syndicated by WABD under the DuMont name to stations largely affiliated with ABC, which did not program to affiliates in Boxing's Monday night time slot. When Boxing was cancelled in August 1958 by WABD owner Metropolitan Broadcasting (the former DuMont Broadcasting) only five affiliates remained.

== Affiliates ==
City	State/Dist./Terr.	Station	Channel	Affiliation	On air now?	Ref.
Birmingham	Alabama	WAFM-TV	13 (VHF)	CBS, ABC, DuMont (c. 1952–1955)	Yes	
Birmingham	Alabama	WBRC	4→6 (VHF)	NBC, ABC, DuMont (1949–1953)	Yes	
Mobile	Alabama	WALA-TV	10 (VHF)	NBC, ABC, CBS, DuMont (1953–1954); NBC, DuMont (1954–1955)	Yes	
Mobile	Alabama	WKAB-TV	48 (UHF)	CBS, DuMont (1952–1954)	No	
Montgomery	Alabama	WCOV-TV	20 (UHF)	NBC, ABC, CBS, DuMont (1953–1954); CBS, ABC, DuMont (1954–1955)	Yes	
Anchorage	Alaska	KTVA	11 (VHF)	NBC, DuMont, ABC (1953–1955)	Yes	
Phoenix	Arizona	KPHO-TV	5 (VHF)	ABC, CBS, DuMont (1949–1955)	Yes	
Phoenix	Arizona	KTYL-TV	12 (VHF)	NBC, DuMont (1953–1956†)	Yes	
Tucson	Arizona	KOPO-TV	13 (VHF)	CBS, DuMont (1953–1955)	Yes	
Yuma	Arizona	KIVA	11 (VHF)	NBC, ABC, CBS, DuMont (1953–1955) (Note: Listed as a non-interconnected affiliate in the Spring 1955 Television Factbook.)	No	
Fort Smith	Arkansas	KFSA-TV	22 (UHF)	NBC, CBS, ABC, DuMont (1953–1955)	Yes	
Little Rock	Arkansas	KARK-TV	4 (VHF)	NBC, DuMont (1954–1955)	Yes	
Little Rock	Arkansas	KRTV	17 (UHF)	CBS, ABC, DuMont, NBC (1953–1954)	No	
Bakersfield	California	KAFY-TV	29 (UHF)	CBS, ABC, NBC, DuMont (1953–1955)	Yes	
Chico	California	KHSL-TV	12 (VHF)	CBS, ABC, NBC, DuMont (1954–1955)	Yes	
Eureka	California	KIEM-TV	3 (VHF)	CBS, ABC, NBC, DuMont (1953–1955)	Yes	
Los Angeles	California	KTLA	5 (VHF)	DuMont (1947–1948)	Yes	(Note: The FCC ruled this station was owned-and-operated by DuMont solely because of Pararmount Pictures' ownership stake in the network, but it did not carry DuMont programming after 1948.)
Los Angeles	California	KTSL	2 (VHF)	DuMont (1948–1951)	Yes	(Note: DuMont advertised this station in 1949 as carrying programming via transcription.)
Los Angeles	California	KTTV	11 (VHF)	DuMont (1951–1954)	Yes	
Los Angeles	California	KHJ-TV	9 (VHF)	DuMont (1954–1955)	Yes	
Monterey	California	KSBW-TV	8 (VHF)	NBC, CBS, ABC, DuMont (1953–1955)	Yes	(Note: KSBW-TV and KMBY-TV was a shared-time operation until 1955, when KSBW bought out the other station.)
Monterey	California	KMBY-TV	8 (VHF)	NBC, CBS, ABC, DuMont (1953–1955)	No	(Note: KSBW-TV and KMBY-TV was a shared-time operation until 1955, when KSBW bought out the other station.)
Sacramento	California	KCCC-TV	40 (UHF)	ABC, DuMont (1953–1955)	No	
San Diego	California	KFMB-TV	8 (VHF)	CBS, ABC, NBC, DuMont (1949–1955) (Note: Listed as an alternate affiliate in the Spring 1955 Television Factbook.)	Yes	
San Diego	California	KFSD-TV	10 (VHF)	NBC, DuMont (1953–1955)	Yes	
San Luis Obispo	California	KVEC-TV	6 (VHF)	DuMont, ABC, CBS (1953–1955)	Yes	
San Francisco	California	KPIX	5 (VHF)	CBS, NBC, DuMont (1948–1949); CBS, DuMont, Paramount (1949–1953); CBS, DuMont (1953–1955)	Yes	
Santa Barbara	California	KEYT-TV	3 (VHF)	NBC, CBS, ABC, DuMont (1953–1955)	Yes	
Stockton	California	KOVR	13 (VHF)	DuMont (1953–1955) (Note: KOVR continued to carry Boxing from St. Nicholas Arena through 1957.)	Yes	
Tulare	California	KCOK-TV	27 (UHF)	DuMont (1953–1955)	No	(Note: Renamed KVVG-TV in 1954.)
Colorado Springs	Colorado	KKTV	11 (VHF)	CBS, ABC, DuMont (1952–1955)	Yes	
Denver	Colorado	KFEL-TV	2 (VHF)	DuMont (1952–1955)	Yes	
Grand Junction	Colorado	KFXJ-TV	5 (VHF)	CBS, NBC, ABC, DuMont (1954–1955)	Yes	
Pueblo	Colorado	KDZA-TV	3 (VHF)	DuMont (1953–1954) (Note: All network programming was relayed from KFEL-TV.)	No	
Bridgeport	Connecticut	WICC-TV	43 (UHF)	ABC, DuMont (1953–1955)	No	
Hartford	Connecticut	WGTH-TV	18 (UHF)	ABC, DuMont (1954–1955)	Yes	
New Haven	Connecticut	WNHC-TV	6→8 (VHF)	ABC, CBS, NBC, DuMont (1948–1955); ABC, DuMont (1955)	Yes	
Waterbury	Connecticut	WATR-TV	53 (UHF)	ABC, DuMont (1953–1955) (Note: WATR-TV continued to carry Boxing from St. Nicholas Arena until WABD cancelled the show in August 1958.)	Yes	
Wilmington	Delaware	WDEL-TV	7→12 (VHF)	NBC, DuMont (1949–1955)	No	
Washington	District of Columbia	WTTG	5 (VHF)	DuMont (1945–1955)	Yes	
Jacksonville	Florida	WMBR-TV	4 (VHF)	CBS, ABC, NBC, DuMont (1949–1955)	Yes	
Jacksonville	Florida	WJHP-TV	36 (UHF)	ABC, NBC, DuMont (1953–1955)	No	
Miami–Fort Lauderdale	Florida	WTVJ	4 (VHF)	CBS, NBC, DuMont, ABC (1949–1955)	Yes	
Miami–Fort Lauderdale	Florida	WITV	17 (UHF)	ABC, DuMont (1953–1955) (Note: Despite WITV's affiliation with both ABC and DuMont, WTVJ retained first call rights to programs from both networks.)	No	
Orlando	Florida	WDBO-TV	6 (VHF)	CBS, NBC, ABC, DuMont (1954–1955)	Yes	
Tampa	Florida	WSUN-TV	38 (UHF)	ABC, CBS, NBC, DuMont (1953–1955)	No	
Albany	Georgia	WALB-TV	10 (VHF)	NBC, ABC, DuMont (1954–1955)	Yes	
Atlanta	Georgia	WAGA-TV	5 (VHF)	CBS, DuMont (1949–1955)	Yes	
Atlanta	Georgia	WLWA-TV	8 (VHF)	ABC, DuMont (1951–1955)	Yes	
Augusta	Georgia	WJBF	6 (VHF)	NBC, ABC, DuMont (1953–1955)	Yes	
Macon	Georgia	WMAZ-TV	13 (VHF)	CBS, DuMont (1953–1955)	Yes	
Rome	Georgia	WROM-TV	9 (VHF)	DuMont, CBS (1953–1954)	Yes	
Honolulu	Hawaii	KONA-TV	11 (VHF)	NBC, DuMont (1952–1955)	Yes	
Honolulu	Hawaii	KULA-TV	4 (VHF)	ABC, DuMont (April 1954–1955)	Yes	
Boise	Idaho	KIDO	7 (VHF)	NBC, CBS, DuMont (July–Nov 1953)	Yes	
Boise	Idaho	KBOI-TV	2 (VHF)	CBS, DuMont (Nov 1953–1955)	Yes	
Idaho Falls	Idaho	KID-TV	3 (VHF)	CBS, ABC, DuMont (1953–1955)	Yes	
Champaign	Illinois	WCIA	3 (VHF)	CBS, NBC, DuMont (1953–1955)	Yes	
Chicago	Illinois	WGN-TV	9 (VHF)	DuMont, CBS (1948–1952); DuMont (1952–1955)	Yes	(Note: Connected to DuMont's full-time network circuits as listed in The Hollywood Reporter's 1952 Production Encyclopedia.)
Decatur	Illinois	WTVP	17 (UHF)	ABC, DuMont (1953–1955)	Yes	
Peoria	Illinois	WEEK-TV	25 (UHF)	NBC, DuMont (1953–1955)	Yes	
Peoria	Illinois	WTVH	19 (UHF)	CBS, DuMont (1953–1955)	Yes	
Quincy	Illinois	KHQA-TV	7 (VHF)	CBS, DuMont (1953–1955)	Yes	
Rock Island	Illinois	WHBF-TV	4 (VHF)	CBS, ABC, DuMont (1950–1955)	Yes	
Rockford	Illinois	WTVO	39 (UHF)	NBC, DuMont (1953–1955)	Yes	
Springfield	Illinois	WICS	20 (UHF)	NBC, CBS, DuMont, ABC (1953–1955)	Yes	
Bloomington	Indiana	WTTV	10→4 (VHF)	ABC, CBS, DuMont, NBC (1949–1955)	Yes	
Elkhart	Indiana	WSJV	52 (UHF)	NBC, ABC, DuMont (1954–1955)	Yes	
Evansville	Indiana	WFIE	62 (UHF)	NBC, DuMont, ABC (1953–1955)	Yes	
Fort Wayne	Indiana	WKJG-TV	33 (UHF)	NBC, ABC, DuMont (1954–1955)	Yes	
Indianapolis	Indiana	WFBM-TV	6 (VHF)	CBS, ABC, DuMont, NBC (1949–1955)	Yes	
Indianapolis	Indiana	WISH-TV	8 (VHF)	ABC, CBS, DuMont (1954–1955)	Yes	
Lafayette	Indiana	WFAM-TV	59 (UHF)	CBS, DuMont (1953–1954)	Yes	
Muncie	Indiana	WLBC-TV	49 (UHF)	CBS, NBC, ABC, DuMont (1953–1955)	Yes	
South Bend	Indiana	WSBT-TV	22 (UHF)	CBS, NBC, ABC, DuMont (1952–1955)	Yes	
Terre Haute	Indiana	WTHI-TV	10 (VHF)	CBS, ABC, NBC, DuMont (1954–1955)	Yes	
Cedar Rapids	Iowa	WMT-TV	2 (VHF)	CBS, DuMont (1953–1955)	Yes	
Des Moines	Iowa	WOI-TV	5 (VHF)	CBS, ABC, NBC, DuMont (1950–1954); CBS, ABC, DuMont (1954–1955); ABC, DuMont (1955)	Yes	
Mason City	Iowa	KGLO-TV	3 (VHF)	CBS, DuMont (1954–1955)	Yes	
Sioux City	Iowa	KVTV	9 (VHF)	CBS, DuMont, NBC, ABC (1953–1955)	Yes	
Sioux City	Iowa	KTIV	4 (VHF)	NBC, ABC, DuMont (1954–1955)	Yes	
Waterloo	Iowa	KWWL-TV	7 (VHF)	NBC, DuMont (1953–1955)	Yes	
Pittsburg	Kansas	KOAM-TV	7 (VHF)	CBS, NBC, DuMont, ABC (1953–1955)	Yes	
Wichita	Kansas	KTVH	12 (VHF)	CBS, NBC, ABC, DuMont (1953–1954); CBS, ABC, DuMont (1954–1955); CBS, DuMont (1955)	Yes	
Louisville	Kentucky	WAVE-TV	3 (VHF)	NBC, DuMont, ABC (1948–1955)	Yes	
Louisville	Kentucky	WKLO-TV	21 (UHF)	ABC, DuMont (1953–1954)	No	
Baton Rouge	Louisiana	WAFB	28 (UHF)	CBS, NBC, ABC, DuMont (1953–1955)	Yes	
Lake Charles	Louisiana	KTAG-TV	25 (UHF)	CBS, ABC, DuMont (1953–1955)	No	
Monroe	Louisiana	KNOE-TV	8 (VHF)	CBS, ABC, NBC, DuMont (1953–1955)	Yes	
New Orleans	Louisiana	WDSU-TV	6 (VHF)	NBC, CBS, ABC, DuMont (1948–1953); NBC, DuMont (1953–1955)	Yes	
New Orleans	Louisiana	WJMR-TV	61 (UHF)	ABC, CBS, DuMont (1953–1955)	Yes	
Shreveport	Louisiana	KCMC-TV	6 (VHF)	CBS, NBC, ABC, DuMont (1953–1955)	Yes	
Bangor	Maine	WABI-TV	5 (VHF)	NBC, CBS, ABC, DuMont (1953–1955); CBS, NBC, ABC, DuMont (1955)	Yes	
Lewiston	Maine	WLAM	17 (UHF)	DuMont, CBS, ABC, NBC (1953–1954)	No	
Poland Spring	Maine	WMTW-TV	8 (VHF)	ABC, CBS, DuMont (1954–1955)	Yes	
Portland	Maine	WPMT	53 (UHF)	DuMont, CBS, ABC, NBC (1953–1954)	No	
Baltimore	Maryland	WAAM-TV	13 (VHF)	ABC, DuMont (1948–1955)	Yes	
Salisbury	Maryland	WBOC-TV	16 (UHF)	DuMont, CBS, NBC, ABC (1954–1955)	Yes	
Adams	Massachusetts	WMGT	74 (UHF)	DuMont, WPIX sportscasts (1954–1955); ABC, DuMont (1955)	No	
Boston	Massachusetts	WBZ-TV	4 (VHF)	NBC, ABC, DuMont (1948–1955)	Yes	
Boston	Massachusetts	WNAC-TV	7 (VHF)	Yankee, ABC, CBS, DuMont (1948–1952); ABC, CBS, DuMont (1952–1955)	No	
Cambridge	Massachusetts	WTAO-TV	56 (UHF)	ABC, DuMont (1953–1955)	No	
Holyoke	Massachusetts	WHYN-TV	55 (UHF)	CBS, DuMont (1953–1955)	Yes	
Worcester	Massachusetts	WWOR-TV	14 (UHF)	ABC, DuMont (1953–1955)	No	
Ann Arbor	Michigan	WPAG-TV	20 (UHF)	DuMont (1953–1955)	No	
Cadillac	Michigan	WWTV	13 (VHF)	CBS, ABC, DuMont (1954–1955)	Yes	
Detroit	Michigan	WJBK-TV	2 (VHF)	CBS, DuMont (1948–1955)	Yes	
Flint	Michigan	WTAC-TV	16 (UHF)	ABC, DuMont (1953–1954)	No	
Grand Rapids	Michigan	WLAV-TV	7 (VHF)	ABC, CBS, DuMont, NBC (1949–1955)	Yes	(Note: Renamed WOOD-TV in 1951.)
Kalamazoo	Michigan	WKZO-TV	3 (VHF)	ABC, CBS, DuMont, NBC (1950–1955)	Yes	
Lansing	Michigan	WILS-TV	54 (UHF)	ABC, DuMont (1953–1955)	No	(Note: Renamed WTOM-TV in 1954.)
Lansing	Michigan	WJIM-TV	6 (VHF)	CBS, ABC, DuMont, NBC (1950–1956†)	Yes	
Saginaw	Michigan	WNEM-TV	5 (VHF)	NBC, ABC, DuMont (1954–1955)	Yes	
Austin	Minnesota	KMMT	6 (VHF)	ABC, CBS, NBC, DuMont (1953–1956†)	Yes	
Duluth	Minnesota	WFTV	38 (UHF)	ABC, CBS, NBC, DuMont (1953–1954)	No	
Minneapolis–Saint Paul	Minnesota	KEYD-TV	9 (VHF)	DuMont (1955)	Yes	
Minneapolis–Saint Paul	Minnesota	KSTP-TV	5 (VHF)	NBC, DuMont (1948–1949)	Yes	
Minneapolis–Saint Paul	Minnesota	WTCN-TV	4 (VHF)	CBS, ABC, DuMont (1949–1953)	Yes	(Note: Renamed WCCO-TV in 1952.)
Minneapolis–Saint Paul	Minnesota	WMIN-TV	11 (VHF)	ABC, DuMont (1953–1955)	No	(Note: WTCN-TV and WMIN-TV was a shared-time operation until 1955, when WTCN-TV bought out the other station.)
Minneapolis–Saint Paul	Minnesota	WTCN-TV	11 (VHF)	ABC, DuMont (1953–1955)	Yes	(Note: WTCN-TV and WMIN-TV was a shared-time operation until 1955, when WTCN-TV bought out the other station.)
Rochester	Minnesota	KROC-TV	10 (VHF)	NBC, ABC, DuMont (1953–1956†)	Yes	
Jackson	Mississippi	WJTV	25 (UHF)	DuMont (January 1953–1955)	Yes	
Meridian	Mississippi	WTOK-TV	11 (VHF)	CBS, ABC, DuMont, NBC (1953–1955)	Yes	
Cape Girardeau	Missouri	KFVS-TV	12 (VHF)	CBS, ABC, DuMont, NBC (1954–1955)	Yes	
Columbia	Missouri	KOMU-TV	8 (VHF)	NBC, ABC, CBS, DuMont (1953–1955)	Yes	
Kansas City	Missouri	WDAF-TV	4 (VHF)	NBC, CBS, ABC, DuMont (1949–1952)	Yes	
Kansas City	Missouri	KCTY-TV	25 (UHF)	DuMont (1953–1954)	No	
Kansas City	Missouri	KCMO-TV	5 (VHF)	ABC, DuMont (1954–1955)	Yes	
St. Louis	Missouri	KSD-TV	5 (VHF)	NBC, CBS, ABC, DuMont (1947–1956†)	Yes	
St. Louis	Missouri	WTVI	54→36 (UHF)	DuMont, ABC (1953–1955)	Yes	(Note: Renamed KTVI in 1955.)
St. Joseph	Missouri	KFEQ-TV	2 (VHF)	CBS, DuMont (1953–1955)	Yes	
Billings	Montana	KOOK-TV	2 (VHF)	CBS, DuMont (1953–1955)	Yes	
Butte	Montana	KXLF-TV	4 (VHF)	CBS, NBC, DuMont, ABC (1953–1955)	Yes	
Great Falls	Montana	KFBB-TV	5 (VHF)	ABC, CBS, NBC, DuMont (1954–1955)	Yes	
Missoula	Montana	KGVO-TV	13 (VHF)	CBS, DuMont, ABC (1954–1955)	Yes	
Kearney	Nebraska	KHOL-TV	13 (VHF)	CBS, DuMont (1953–1955)	Yes	
Lincoln	Nebraska	KOLN	12→10 (VHF)	DuMont (1953–1954); CBS, ABC, DuMont, NBC (1954–1955)	Yes	
Omaha	Nebraska	KMTV	3 (VHF)	ABC, CBS, DuMont (1949–1955)	Yes	
Omaha	Nebraska	WOW-TV	6 (VHF)	NBC, ABC, DuMont (1952–1955)	Yes	
Las Vegas	Nevada	KLAS-TV	8 (VHF)	CBS, DuMont, NBC, ABC (1953–1955)	Yes	
Reno	Nevada	KZTV	8 (VHF)	CBS, NBC, ABC, DuMont (1953–1955)	Yes	
Atlantic City	New Jersey	WFPG-TV	46 (UHF)	DuMont, CBS, ABC, NBC (1952–1956†)	No	
Albuquerque	New Mexico	KOB-TV	4 (VHF)	NBC, DuMont (1948–1955)	Yes	
Albuquerque	New Mexico	KOAT-TV	7 (VHF)	ABC, DuMont (1954–1955)	Yes	
Roswell	New Mexico	KSWS-TV	8 (VHF)	NBC, CBS, ABC, DuMont (1953–1955)	Yes	
Albany–Schenectady	New York	WROW-TV	10 (VHF)	CBS, DuMont (1954–1955)	Yes	
Albany–Schenectady	New York	WRGB	4→6 (VHF)	NBC, ABC, CBS, DuMont (1948–1954)	Yes	
Binghamton	New York	WNBF-TV	12 (VHF)	ABC, CBS, DuMont, NBC (1949–1955)	Yes	
Buffalo	New York	WBEN-TV	4 (VHF)	CBS, ABC, NBC, DuMont (1949–1954); CBS, DuMont, ABC (1954–1955)	Yes	
Buffalo	New York	WGR-TV	2 (VHF)	NBC, ABC, DuMont (1954–1955)	Yes	
Buffalo	New York	WBUF-TV	17 (UHF)	ABC, CBS, DuMont (1954–1955)	Yes	
Elmira	New York	WTVE	24 (UHF)	DuMont (1953–1954)	No	
New York City	New York	WABD	5 (VHF)	DuMont (1942–1955)	Yes	
Plattsburgh	New York	WIRI-TV	5 (VHF)	NBC, ABC, DuMont (1954–1955)	Yes	
Rochester	New York	WHAM-TV	6→5 (VHF)	NBC, CBS, ABC, DuMont (1949–1952+); NBC, DuMont (c. 1955)	Yes	
Syracuse	New York	WHEN-TV	8 (VHF)	CBS, ABC, DuMont (1948–1955)	Yes	
Utica–Rome	New York	WKTV	13 (VHF)	CBS, NBC, ABC, DuMont (1949–1955)	Yes	
Watertown	New York	WCNY-TV	7 (VHF)	CBS, NBC, ABC, DuMont (1954–1955)	Yes	
Asheville	North Carolina	WLOS-TV	13 (VHF)	ABC, DuMont (1953–1955)	Yes	
Charlotte	North Carolina	WBTV	3 (VHF)	CBS, ABC, DuMont, NBC (1949–1955)	Yes	
Charlotte	North Carolina	WAYS-TV	36 (UHF)	ABC, CBS, DuMont (1954–1955)	Yes	(Note: Renamed WQMC in January 1954.)
Greensboro–Winston-Salem	North Carolina	WFMY-TV	2 (VHF)	CBS, NBC, ABC, DuMont (1949–1953); CBS, ABC, DuMont (1953–1955)	Yes	
Greensboro–Winston-Salem	North Carolina	WTOB-TV	26 (UHF)	ABC, DuMont (1953–1955)	No	
Greenville	North Carolina	WNCT-TV	9 (VHF)	CBS, DuMont (1953–1955)	Yes	
Raleigh	North Carolina	WNAO-TV	28 (UHF)	ABC, CBS, DuMont (1953–1955)	No	
Bismarck	North Dakota	KFYR-TV	5 (VHF)	NBC, ABC, DuMont (1953–1955)	Yes	
Fargo	North Dakota	KXJB-TV	4 (VHF)	CBS, DuMont (1954–1955)	Yes	
Fargo	North Dakota	WDAY-TV	6 (VHF)	NBC, CBS, DuMont (1953–1954)	Yes	
Cincinnati	Ohio	WLWT	4 (VHF)	NBC, CBS, ABC, DuMont (1948–1949); NBC, DuMont (1949)	Yes	
Cincinnati	Ohio	WCPO-TV	7→9 (VHF)	ABC, DuMont (1949–1955)	Yes	
Cleveland	Ohio	WEWS-TV	5 (VHF)	CBS, NBC, ABC, DuMont (1947–1948); CBS, ABC, DuMont (1948–1949); ABC, DuMont (1955) (Note: WEWS continued to carry Boxing from St. Nicholas Arena until November 1957.)	Yes	
Cleveland	Ohio	WXEL	9→8 (VHF)	DuMont, ABC (1949–1955)	Yes	
Columbus	Ohio	WLWC	3 (VHF)	NBC, DuMont (1949–1952)	Yes	
Columbus	Ohio	WTVN-TV	6 (VHF)	ABC, DuMont (1949–1955)	Yes	
Dayton	Ohio	WHIO-TV	13→7 (VHF)	CBS, ABC, DuMont (1949–1955)	Yes	
Dayton	Ohio	WLWD	2 (VHF)	NBC, ABC, DuMont (1949–1955)	Yes	
Lima	Ohio	WLOK-TV	73→35 (UHF)	NBC, CBS, DuMont (1953–1954); NBC, CBS, ABC, DuMont (1954–1955)	Yes	(Note: Renamed WIMA-TV in 1955.)
Toledo	Ohio	WSPD-TV	13 (VHF)	NBC, DuMont (c. July 1948); ABC, CBS, NBC, DuMont (1952–1955)	Yes	
Youngstown	Ohio	WKBN-TV	27 (UHF)	CBS, DuMont, ABC (1953–1955)	Yes	
Zanesville	Ohio	WHIZ-TV	50→18 (UHF)	NBC, DuMont, CBS, ABC (1953–1955)	Yes	
Lawton	Oklahoma	KSWO-TV	7 (VHF)	ABC, CBS, NBC, DuMont (1953–1955)	Yes	
Oklahoma City	Oklahoma	WKY-TV	4 (VHF)	NBC, ABC, CBS, DuMont (1949–1953)	Yes	
Oklahoma City	Oklahoma	KMPT	19 (UHF)	DuMont, ABC (1953–1955)	No	(Note: Known on-air at launch as "KLPR-TV" but was legally known as KMPT.)
Tulsa	Oklahoma	KCEB-TV	23 (UHF)	NBC, DuMont (Mar–Sept 1954); ABC, DuMont (Sept–Dec 1954)	No	
Tulsa	Oklahoma	KOTV	6 (VHF)	CBS, NBC, ABC, DuMont (1949–1953)	Yes	
Medford	Oregon	KBES-TV	5 (VHF)	CBS, NBC, ABC, DuMont (1953–1955)	Yes	
Portland	Oregon	KPTV	27 (UHF)	NBC, CBS, ABC, DuMont (1952–1953); NBC, ABC, DuMont (1953–1955)	Yes	
Allentown–Easton	Pennsylvania	WGLV-TV	57 (UHF)	ABC, DuMont (1953–1955)	No	
Altoona	Pennsylvania	WFBG-TV	10 (VHF)	CBS, DuMont (1953–1955)	Yes	
Erie	Pennsylvania	WICU-TV	12 (VHF)	NBC, CBS, ABC, DuMont (1949–1955)	Yes	
Erie	Pennsylvania	WSEE-TV	35 (UHF)	CBS, ABC, DuMont (1954–1955)	Yes	
Harrisburg	Pennsylvania	WCMB-TV	27 (UHF)	DuMont (1954–1955)	No	
Johnstown	Pennsylvania	WJAC-TV	6 (VHF)	NBC, CBS, ABC, DuMont (1949–1955)	Yes	
Johnstown	Pennsylvania	WARD-TV	56 (UHF)	CBS, DuMont (1953–1955)	Yes	
Lancaster	Pennsylvania	WGAL	4→8 (VHF)	ABC, CBS, DuMont, NBC (1949–1955)	Yes	
Philadelphia	Pennsylvania	WFIL-TV	6 (VHF)	CBS, DuMont (1947–1948); ABC, DuMont (1948–1955)	Yes	
Pittsburgh	Pennsylvania	WDTV	3→2 (VHF)	DuMont, NBC, CBS, ABC (1949–1955)	Yes	(Note: Renamed KDKA-TV in 1955.)
Wilkes-Barre	Pennsylvania	WILK-TV	34 (UHF)	ABC, DuMont (1953–1955)	Yes	
York	Pennsylvania	WNOW-TV	49 (UHF)	DuMont (1953–1955)	No	
San Juan	Puerto Rico	WAPA-TV	4 (VHF)	NBC, ABC, DuMont (1954–1955)	Yes	
Providence	Rhode Island	WJAR-TV	11→10 (VHF)	NBC, CBS, ABC, DuMont (1950–1955)	Yes	
Providence	Rhode Island	WNET	16 (UHF)	ABC, DuMont (1953–1955)	No	
Charleston	South Carolina	WCSC-TV	5 (VHF)	CBS, DuMont (1953–1955)	Yes	
Columbia	South Carolina	WNOK-TV	67 (UHF)	CBS, DuMont (1953–1955)	Yes	
Greenville	South Carolina	WGVL	23 (UHF)	DuMont (1953–1955)	No	
Sioux Falls	South Dakota	KELO-TV	11 (VHF)	NBC, ABC, CBS, DuMont (1953–1955)	Yes	
Chattanooga	Tennessee	WDEF-TV	12 (VHF)	NBC, CBS, ABC, DuMont (1954–1955)	Yes	
Johnson City	Tennessee	WJHL-TV	11 (VHF)	CBS, NBC, ABC, DuMont (1953–1955)	Yes	
Knoxville	Tennessee	WTSK-TV	26 (UHF)	CBS, DuMont, ABC (1953–1955)	Yes	
Memphis	Tennessee	WMCT	5 (VHF)	NBC, CBS, ABC, DuMont (1948–1953); NBC, ABC, DuMont (1953–1955)	Yes	
Memphis	Tennessee	WHBQ-TV	13 (VHF)	CBS, ABC, DuMont (1953–1955)	Yes	
Nashville	Tennessee	WSM-TV	4 (VHF)	NBC, ABC, CBS, DuMont (1950–1953); NBC, ABC, DuMont (1953–1954); NBC, DuMont (1954–1955)	Yes	
Nashville	Tennessee	WSIX-TV	8 (VHF)	CBS, ABC, DuMont (1953–1954); ABC, DuMont (1954–1955)	Yes	
Abilene	Texas	KRBC-TV	9 (VHF)	NBC, ABC, DuMont (1953–1955)	Yes	
Amarillo	Texas	KGNC-TV	4 (VHF)	NBC, DuMont (1953–1955)	Yes	
Austin	Texas	KTBC-TV	7 (VHF)	CBS, ABC, DuMont, NBC (1952–1955)	Yes	
Beaumont	Texas	KBMT	31 (UHF)	ABC, DuMont, NBC (1954–1955)	Yes	
Corpus Christi	Texas	KVDO	22 (UHF)	NBC, CBS, DuMont (1954–1956†)	No	
Dallas–Fort Worth	Texas	KBTV	8 (VHF)	DuMont, CBS (1949–1950); NBC, ABC, DuMont (1952–1955)	Yes	
El Paso	Texas	KROD-TV	4 (VHF)	CBS, ABC, DuMont (1952–1955)	Yes	
Harlingen	Texas	KGBT-TV	4 (VHF)	CBS, ABC, DuMont (1953–1955)	Yes	
Houston	Texas	KPRC-TV	2 (VHF)	NBC, CBS, ABC, DuMont (1949–1953)	Yes	
Houston	Texas	KNUZ-TV	39 (UHF)	DuMont (1953–1954)	No	
Houston	Texas	KGUL-TV	11 (VHF)	CBS, ABC, DuMont (1953–1955)	Yes	
Lubbock	Texas	KDUB-TV	13 (VHF)	CBS, DuMont (1952–1955)	Yes	
Midland–Odessa	Texas	KMID-TV	2 (VHF)	ABC, CBS, NBC, DuMont (1953–1955)	Yes	
San Antonio	Texas	KEYL	5 (VHF)	ABC, CBS, DuMont (1950–1955)	Yes	
Tyler	Texas	KETX	19 (UHF)	NBC, DuMont, CBS (1953–1954)	No	
Waco	Texas	KANG-TV	34 (UHF)	ABC, DuMont (1953–1955)	No	
Wichita Falls	Texas	KWFT-TV	6 (VHF)	CBS, DuMont (1953–1955)	Yes	
Salt Lake City	Utah	KSL-TV	5 (VHF)	CBS, ABC, DuMont (1949–1955)	Yes	
Harrisonburg	Virginia	WSVA-TV	3 (VHF)	NBC, CBS, ABC, DuMont (1953–1955)	Yes	
Lynchburg	Virginia	WLVA-TV	13 (VHF)	CBS, DuMont, ABC (1953–1955)	Yes	
Norfolk	Virginia	WTAR-TV	4→3 (VHF)	NBC, CBS, ABC, DuMont (1950–1952); CBS, NBC, ABC, DuMont (1952–1953); CBS, ABC, DuMont (1953–1955)	Yes	
Norfolk	Virginia	WVEC-TV	15 (UHF)	NBC, DuMont (1953–1955)	Yes	
Portsmouth	Virginia	WTOV	27 (UHF)	DuMont (1953–1955)	No	
Richmond	Virginia	WTVR-TV	6 (VHF)	CBS, DuMont, NBC, ABC (1948–1955)	Yes	
Bellingham	Washington	KVOS-TV	12 (VHF)	DuMont (1953–1955)	Yes	
Seattle–Tacoma	Washington	KRSC-TV	5 (VHF)	ABC, NBC, CBS, DuMont (c. 1949–1952)	Yes	
Seattle–Tacoma	Washington	KTNT-TV	11 (VHF)	CBS, DuMont (March 1953–1955)	Yes	
Spokane	Washington	KXLY-TV	4 (VHF)	CBS, DuMont (1953–1955)	Yes	
Charleston	West Virginia	WKNA-TV	49 (UHF)	ABC, DuMont (1953–1955)	No	
Huntington	West Virginia	WSAZ-TV	3 (VHF)	NBC, CBS, ABC, DuMont (1949–1954); NBC, ABC, DuMont (1954–1955); NBC, DuMont (1955)	Yes	
Oak Hill	West Virginia	WOAY-TV	4 (VHF)	ABC, DuMont (1954–1956†)	Yes	
Eau Claire	Wisconsin	WEAU-TV	13 (VHF)	NBC, ABC, DuMont (1954–1955)	Yes	
La Crosse	Wisconsin	WKBT	8 (VHF)	NBC, ABC, CBS, DuMont (1954–1955)	Yes	
Green Bay	Wisconsin	WBAY-TV	2 (VHF)	CBS, ABC, NBC, DuMont (1953–1955)	Yes	
Green Bay	Wisconsin	WFRV-TV	5 (VHF)	ABC, DuMont (1955)	Yes	
Madison	Wisconsin	WMTV	33 (UHF)	ABC, DuMont, NBC (1953–1955)	Yes	
Milwaukee	Wisconsin	WOKY-TV	19 (UHF)	ABC, DuMont (1953–1954)	Yes	
Milwaukee	Wisconsin	WTMJ-TV	4 (VHF)	NBC, CBS, ABC, DuMont (c. 1949–1953)	Yes	
Milwaukee	Wisconsin	WTVW	12 (VHF)	ABC, DuMont (1954–1955)	Yes	
Wausau	Wisconsin	WSAU-TV	7 (VHF)	CBS, ABC, DuMont, NBC (1954–1955†)	Yes	
Cheyenne	Wyoming	KFBC-TV	5 (VHF)	CBS, NBC, ABC, DuMont (1954–1955)	Yes	
Windsor	Ontario, Canada	CKLW-TV	9 (VHF)	CBC, DuMont (1954–1955) (Note: CKLW-TV continued to carry Boxing from St. Nicholas Arena through December 1956.)	Yes	
Matamoros	Tamaulipas, Mexico	XELD-TV	7 (VHF)	CBS, ABC, DuMont, NBC (1951–1954)	No	

== Notes ==
† Ending dates tentative; source does not give a date for their affiliation with DuMont ending or that it ended when the network closed.
