= NBC 23 =

NBC 23 may refer to one of the following television stations in the United States:

== Current ==
- KAGS-LD in Bryan–College Station, Texas
- KMCB in Coos Bay, Oregon
  - Full satellite of KMTR in Eugene, Oregon
- KNDO in Yakima, Washington
- KVEO-TV in Brownsville, Texas
- WRGX-LD in Dothan, Alabama

== Former ==
- KCEB in Tulsa, Oklahoma (1954)
- KERO-TV in Bakersfield, California (1963–1984)
- WFTL-TV/WGBS-TV in Miami, Florida (1954–1956)
