= Travis Meyer =

Travis Meyer may refer to:

- Travis Meyer (meteorologist), American television meteorologist for KOTV-DT in Tulsa, Oklahoma
- Travis Meyer (cyclist) (born 1989), Australian professional racing cyclist
