= KOKI-TV =

Television station in Tulsa, Oklahoma

- Tulsa, Oklahoma; United States
- Channels: Digital: 22 (UHF); Virtual: 23

Programming
- Affiliations: 23.1: Roar; for others, see § Subchannels

Ownership
- Owner: Standard Media; (Community News Media LLC)
- Operator: Sinclair Broadcast Group (outright sale pending)
- Sister stations: KTUL; KMYT-TV

History
- First air date: October 26, 1980
- Former channel number: Analog: 23 (UHF, 1980–2009)
- Former affiliations: Independent (1980–1986); Fox (1986–2026)
- Call sign meaning: Okie, "Oklahoma's Independent" (reference to previous status)

Technical information
- Licensing authority: FCC
- Facility ID: 11910
- ERP: 1,000 kW
- HAAT: 400 m (1,312 ft)
- Transmitter coordinates: 36°1′36″N 95°40′45″W

Links
- Public license information: Public file; LMS

KOKI-TV (channel 23) is a television station in Tulsa, Oklahoma, United States, airing programming from the digital multicast network Roar. It is owned by Standard Media and operated by Sinclair Broadcast Group alongside KTUL (channel 8), an affiliate of ABC and Fox, and KMYT-TV (channel 41), an independent station with MyNetworkTV. The three stations share studios on East 27th Street and South Memorial Drive (near W. G. Skelly Park) in the Audubon neighborhood of southeast Tulsa; KOKI-TV's transmitter is located on South 273rd East Avenue (between 91st Street South and 101st Street South, next to the Muskogee Turnpike) in the western city limits of Coweta.

KOKI-TV began broadcasting on October 26, 1980, as Tulsa's first independent station and the first UHF station in the market since KCEB briefly used the channel in 1954. It was built by a consortium of local businessmen known as Tulsa 23 Ltd. It competed with channel 41, then known as KGCT and KTFO, throughout the 1980s and 1990s but was the stronger station in ratings and programming. In 1986, it became Tulsa's first affiliate of the Fox network.

Tulsa 23 sold KOKI-TV to Clear Channel Television in 1989. Under Clear Channel, whose radio division owned stations in Tulsa, channel 23 became profitable with the growth of the Fox network. The operation expanded with control and a later purchase of channel 41 as well as the 2002 debut of a local news department. Initially producing just a 9 p.m. newscast, the station steadily expanded news coverage under the successive ownerships of Clear Channel, Newport Television, and Cox Media Group. Cox sold KOKI-TV and a number of smaller-market stations to Imagicomm Communications in 2022, and in 2025 Rincon Broadcasting Group acquired part of Imagicomm's portfolio. Rincon sold the Fox affiliation in February 2026 to Sinclair Broadcast Group, and Fox23 and its programming became a subchannel of KTUL as a result.

== Prior use of channel 23 ==
Ultra high frequency (UHF) channel 23 in Tulsa was first used by KCEB, a station that began broadcasting on March 14, 1954, under the ownership of oil entrepreneur Edward Beck. It was Tulsa's second television station, after KOTV (channel 6), and broadcast from Lookout Mountain with programming from NBC and the DuMont Television Network. KCEB was a financial failure, losing more than $600,000 in its operation before it closed on December 24 of that year. The site was sold to KTVX (channel 8, now KTUL) to aid in its relocation from Muskogee.

== History ==
=== Early years ===
The dormant UHF channel 23 allocation was contested by two applicants seeking a construction permit. Wilson Communications, owned by Detroit businessman and Buffalo Bills owner Ralph Wilson, filed an application with the Federal Communications Commission (FCC) on July 7, 1978. Tulsa 23, Ltd., which filed on September 5, was led by Benjamin F. Boddie. The group included prominent local business leaders such as Helmerich & Payne CEO Walter H. Helmerich II and Williams Companies executives John H. and Charles P. Williams. The FCC awarded the license to Tulsa 23 on December 12, 1979.

Logo used throughout KOKI's years as an independent station and for the first years of it being a Fox affiliate

KOKI-TV signed on October 26, 1980, as the market's first independent station. It was also the first UHF television station to operate in Tulsa since KCEB, becoming Tulsa's first new commercial television station since 1954, and the market's first independent station. Branded as "Tulsa 23", it operated from studios on East 46th Place in southeast Tulsa, using second-hand equipment. The station ran on a lean budget, airing a mix of classic sitcoms, westerns and drama series, cartoons, feature films, and a limited number of sports events and religious programs aimed largely at older and rural audiences. Its transmitter facility was located near Coweta in Wagoner County, utilizing a 1,392-foot (424 m) tower.

KOKI gained competition on March 18, 1981, when KGCT-TV began broadcasting on channel 41. KOKI outdistanced KGCT in the ratings; KOKI-TV had obtained a 5% share of television viewing in Tulsa as of the May 1981 Arbitron ratings, while KGCT was not registering viewers. A 1983 Ogilvy & Mather study found KOKI was the only Tulsa station to increase viewership from May 1981 to May 1983, posting significant gains in early-evening, prime time, and late-night slots, while the three network affiliates saw declines in those same dayparts. Its strongest window was the 3:30 to 6:30 p.m. slot known as "early fringe", where it had an audience share of 19 percent.

The slogan used to promote KOKI's film offerings, "Oklahoma's Movie Star", became the subject of a federal trademark infringement lawsuit filed in October 1982 against Home Box Office Inc. over Cinemax's "We Are Your Movie Star" campaign. In November 1983, U.S. District Judge James Ellison issued an injunction against HBO, a decision upheld by the Tenth Circuit on December 9, forcing Cinemax to abandon the campaign.

=== Fox affiliation and Clear Channel purchase ===
When the Fox network launched in October 1986, it had no affiliate in Tulsa, discussing possible terms of affiliation with KOKI and KGCT. Even though KGCT's manager had sent over what he thought was an affiliation contract, Fox claimed it was only a sample agreement. Fox's vice president of affiliate relations, Bob Mariano, spoke highly of a possible affiliation with KOKI and told the Tulsa World that the network had one major concern with channel 41: "Our problem at the moment with KGCT is that it is not carried on Tulsa Cable." In August 1987, Fox agreed to affiliate with KOKI. KOKI absorbed some of KGCT's programming after that station left the air in March 1989.

Tulsa 23 agreed to sell KOKI-TV to San Antonio–based Clear Channel Television for $6.075 million on March 6, 1989. It was the third station to be owned by Clear Channel, whose radio division had expanded into Tulsa in 1974. Citing prolonged losses caused by an economic downturn spurred by an oil exploration slump in the region during the 1980s, Clear Channel sought a "failed station" waiver of FCC rules barring radio–television cross-ownership in the same market, arguing the purchase would provide KOKI—which had never turned a profit—with needed financial support to remain operational and expand its public affairs programming. The FCC approved the sale and waiver on November 17, 1989, and the deal closed two weeks later. As Fox grew into a major network, KOKI became profitable by 1993, producing $5 million per year in cash flow.

In November 1993, Clear Channel Television entered into a local marketing agreement with RDS Broadcasting to provide programming, advertising, and administrative services for channel 41, by this point back on the air and known as KTFO. That station became a UPN affiliate when the network launched in January 1995. In 1999, the FCC legalized duopolies—the outright ownership of two broadcast licenses in a market—and Clear Channel acquired KTFO outright.

=== Starting a news department ===
As early as 1994, Fox expressed interest in KOKI starting a local news department. General manager Hal Capron was skeptical that the market could absorb more local news or that the outlay in setting up a news operation would be worth it. Though Capron announced that a newscast might debut by August 1997, plans were delayed. Coinciding with Fox's airing of Super Bowl XXXI in January 1997, channel 23 debuted an in-house weather service including a five-minute weather forecast to air at 10 p.m. nightly. Capron announced in August 2001 that the station would begin airing an hour-long 9 p.m. newscast in January 2002, timed to Super Bowl XXXVI, which would air on Fox. (Note: Super Bowl XXXVI was originally planned for January 27, 2002, but moved back to February 3 after the September 11 attacks.) The news director came to the station from Clear Channel's WFTC in Minneapolis. The 9 p.m. news launched after the Super Bowl on February 3, 2002.

The news department launch coincided with Clear Channel building new studios to bring its Tulsa television and radio stations under one roof. In 2000, the company bought the former Oertle's discount store on Memorial Drive and renovated it to suit its needs.

In the years after launching the 9 p.m. newscast, KOKI's news department expanded into other dayparts. A weeknight-only 5:30 p.m. newscast premiered on June 17, 2002, expanding to 5 p.m. the following year. A morning newscast, Fox23 News Daybreak, debuted on April 24, 2006, as a four-hour broadcast from 5 to 9 a.m.

=== Newport, Cox, and Imagicomm ownership ===
On April 20, 2007, following its $18.7 billion buyout by private equity firms Thomas H. Lee Partners and Bain Capital, Clear Channel agreed to sell its television stations to Providence Equity Partners for $1.2 billion. The FCC approved the deal on December 1, 2007, and it was finalized on March 14, 2008. Providence formed Newport Television to manage the stations.

KOKI logo used from January 16, 2011, to January 2014.

On August 11, 2011, a man later dubbed "Tower Guy" by local media outlets, entered a restricted area at the KOKI–KMYT facility and climbed a transmission tower, prompting a prolonged police standoff. After more than 150 hours (the longest in Tulsa Police Department history), the standoff ended on August 16 when a retired police negotiator persuaded him to come down. He was taken to a hospital for treatment after being safely removed from the tower.

On July 19, 2012, Newport Television announced it would sell KOKI-TV and KMYT, along with stations in Jacksonville, Florida, to Cox Media Group for $253 million. The deal placed KOKI and KMYT under common ownership with Cox's Tulsa radio stations. The FCC approved the sale on October 23, 2012, and it was finalized on December 3. In 2019, a majority stake in Cox Media Group was sold to Apollo Global Management. The transaction was completed on December 17, 2019.

During the 2010s, KOKI added more newscasts in evening and morning time slots. On January 18, 2010, KOKI debuted a half-hour 10 p.m. newscast. The early evening news block expanded on September 23, 2013, with the debut of a half-hour weeknight newscast at 6 p.m. Weekend morning newscasts followed in 2014. By the mid-2010s, the station had the leading 9 p.m. news but rated a distant second to KOTV in mornings and third or fourth in other time periods. It also ranked third in revenue.

On March 29, 2022, Cox Media Group announced it would sell KOKI-TV, KMYT-TV and 16 other stations to Imagicomm Communications, an affiliate of the parent company of the INSP cable channel, for $488 million; the sale was completed on August 1.

=== Sale to Rincon, then Standard and Fox affiliation sale to Sinclair ===
On April 3, 2025, Imagicomm announced that it would sell seven stations, including KOKI-TV, to Rincon Broadcasting Group; the deal was completed on July 18.

Sinclair Broadcast Group, owner of KTUL, acquired the Fox affiliation from Rincon in February 2026. On February 9, KOKI's main channel schedule and Fox affiliation moved to KTUL 8.2, with a simulcast on 23.1 continuing until March 1, when KOKI's main channel switched to airing Roar. On February 20, Sinclair filed to buy KMYT-TV directly from Rincon for $4.125 million. In March 2026, after having previously cut back news production at KTUL in favor of simulcasts from KOKH-TV in Oklahoma City, Sinclair announced that it would relocate KTUL's news operation to KOKI's studios.

Also in March 2026, Community News Media LLC, which operates as Standard Media Group and is led by Soohyung Kim with Deborah McDermott as chief executive, agreed to acquire Rincon Broadcasting's stations, including KOKI-TV, for $116.5 million; the sale was completed on October 1.

== Notable former on-air staff ==
- Dave Briggs – weekend evening sports anchor/sports reporter, 2002–2004
- Sheinelle Jones – weekend and weeknight anchor/reporter, 2002–2005
- Jeanne Tripplehorn (aka Jeanne Summers) – co-host of Creature Feature, early 1980s

== Technical information ==
=== Subchannels ===
KOKI-TV's transmitter is located on South 273rd East Avenue (between 91st Street South and 101st Street South, next to the Muskogee Turnpike) in the western city limits of Coweta. The station's signal is multiplexed:

Subchannels of KOKI-TV
| Subchannel | Res. | Short name | Programming |
|---|---|---|---|
| 23.1 | 720p | KOKI-DT | Roar |
| 23.2 | 480i | MeTV | MeTV |
| 23.3 | 480i | Dabl | Dabl |
| 23.4 | 480i | Charge! | Charge! |
| 23.5 | 480i | Comet | Comet |
| 23.6 | 480i | TheNest | The Nest |

=== Analog-to-digital conversion ===
KOKI-TV began transmitting a digital television signal on UHF channel 22 on October 1, 2002. The station shut down its analog signal, over UHF channel 23, on June 12, 2009, the official digital television transition date. The station's digital signal remained on its pre-transition UHF channel 22, using virtual channel 23.
