= KMYT-TV =

Television station in Tulsa, Oklahoma

- Tulsa, Oklahoma; United States
- Channels: Digital: 34 (UHF); Virtual: 41
- Branding: My41

Programming
- Affiliations: 41.1: Independent with MyNetworkTV; for others, see § Technical information and subchannels

Ownership
- Owner: Sinclair Broadcast Group; (KMYT Licensee, LLC)
- Sister stations: KTUL; KOKI-TV

History
- First air date: March 18, 1981
- Former call signs: KGCT-TV (1981–1989); KTFO (1991–2006)
- Former channel numbers: Analog: 41 (UHF, 1981–2009); Digital: 42 (UHF, 2001–2018)
- Former affiliations: Independent (1981–1989, 1991–1995); In-Home Theater (subscription TV, 1981–1984); Dark (1989–1991); UPN (1995–2006)
- Call sign meaning: MyNetworkTV Tulsa

Technical information
- Licensing authority: FCC
- Facility ID: 54420
- ERP: 812.5 kW
- HAAT: 373 m (1,224 ft)
- Transmitter coordinates: 36°1′36″N 95°40′45″W

Links
- Public license information: Public file; LMS

KMYT-TV (channel 41) is a television station in Tulsa, Oklahoma, United States. It is programmed primarily as an independent station, but maintains a secondary affiliation with MyNetworkTV. KMYT-TV is owned by Sinclair Broadcast Group alongside ABC/Fox affiliate KTUL (channel 8) and is co-managed with KOKI-TV (channel 23). The three stations share studios on East 27th Street and South Memorial Drive in the Audubon neighborhood of southeast Tulsa; KMYT-TV's transmitter is located on South 273rd East Avenue in Coweta.

Channel 41 began broadcasting March 18, 1981, as KGCT-TV. Owned by a consortium including Satellite Syndicated Systems, the station initially broadcast a block of live, local programs during the day and an over-the-air subscription television service, In-Home Theater (IT), to paying customers at night. The live local programming lasted less than three months, and by 1982 KGCT was airing religious programming during the day. IT peaked at 11,000 subscribers in 1982 and ceased operations in October 1984. The station struggled as Tulsa's second-rated independent station behind KOKI-TV, with low ratings and—after 1986—no cable carriage in Tulsa. Satellite Syndicated Systems, which became Tempo Enterprises in 1986, was sold to Tele-Communications Inc. in 1988 and divested its ownership stake in channel 41. The firm had been underwriting most of the station's operating expenses. On February 1, 1989, it was taken off the air while sale negotiations were ongoing.

The station returned to the air under the ownership of RDS Broadcasting in 1991 as KTFO. Two years later, RDS contracted operations out to Clear Channel Television, which at the time owned KOKI-TV. It became a UPN affiliate when that network launched in 1995 and switched to MyNetworkTV when UPN closed in 2006. Successive sales since 2008 have seen KMYT-TV owned by Newport Television, Cox Media Group, Imagicomm Communications, Rincon Broadcasting Group, and Sinclair.

== KGCT ==
=== Early years ===
In 1978, Billy James Hargis applied through the David Livingstone Missionary Foundation for permission to build a new TV station on channel 41 in Tulsa. His bid was part of a boom in interest for new TV stations in Tulsa, with four applications seeking one of channels 23, 41, and 47 by the start of September 1978. Further applications were later received by the Federal Communications Commission (FCC). Green Country Television, owned by Ray Beindorf and William R. Brannan, applied in early September, and Satellite Television Systems, Limited Partnership, had also applied. By 1980, there were three applicants: Satellite Television Systems, Green Country Television, and Western Area Bureau of Information, Broadcasting Division. That July, the FCC granted Tulsa TV 41, a joint venture of Satellite Television Systems (renamed to Satellite Syndicated Systems, SSS) and Green Country Television, a construction permit for the channel.

KGCT-TV launched on March 18, 1981. It broadcast from downtown studios in the Old Lerner's Building on Tulsa's Main Mall. During the day on weekdays, KGCT-TV offered old movies and Westerns from 9 a.m. to noon before broadcasting a seven-hour block of live studio, news, and audience participation programming known as 41 Live!, utilizing its downtown location, with half-hour blocks devoted to cooking, sports, news, and business, among other topics. Hosts included John Erling, Glenda Silvey, and Beth Rengel. Karen Keith was a reporter. After 7 p.m. on weekdays and 5 p.m. on weekends, the station offered subscription television programming to paying customers under the brand In-Home Theater (IT); this included first-run motion pictures from SelecTV. IT also offered limited sports specials, notably games of the 1983 Tulsa Roughnecks season; the team made Soccer Bowl '83, which was broadcast free-to-air.

KGCT-TV was the second television station to launch within six months in Tulsa. KOKI-TV began broadcasting on channel 23 on October 26, 1980, with a more conventional independent station format of movies, sports, specials, and syndicated programs. While KOKI-TV had obtained a 5% share of television viewing in Tulsa as of the May 1981 Arbitron ratings, KGCT was not registering viewers. In response, KGCT canceled its daytime live programming block on June 25 and fired 15 employees, including the entire 10-person news staff. The daytime was reprogrammed with cheaper syndicated programs. Two programs—a series of hosted movie blocks and a teen dance show hosted by KRAV-FM disc jockey Steve Cassidy—were added to the lineup in January 1982. At that time, station management announced a marketing campaign to explain to people that had already installed UHF loop antennas for channel 23 that they could also tune channel 41.

In May 1982, KGCT underwent another programming change. Subscription television from IT was expanded with more late-night hours and a weekend startup at 1 p.m. Later that month, the remaining daytime hours were leased to Jack Rehberg Ministries to bring Tulsa its first primarily religious television station. Under Rehberg, who had initially sought time for a religious telethon, KGCT—promoted as "Knitting God's Children Together"—offered local ministry programs as well as national shows such as The 700 Club and Jerry Falwell. The station relocated from the Main Mall to facilities on 59th Street. When Rehberg ceased paying for the station's airtime because he had bought channel 47, Green Country Television continued much the same programming format.

In-Home Theater had as many as 11,000 subscribers in the Tulsa area at its peak in 1982. That number had dwindled to 3,700 by September 1984, in the face of increasing competition from cable television, and the service was losing money. As a result, SSS discontinued IT in Tulsa effective October 31, 1984, and expanded KGCT-TV's ad-supported schedule to fill the gap. In 1985, Tulsa TV 41 attempted to sell KGCT-TV to Channel 41 Associates, a consortium including the Carlyle Group of Los Angeles, owners of KNMZ-TV in Santa Fe, New Mexico. The group's members also included former ABC executive I. Martin Pompadur. The prospective buyers cited low programming costs in the Tulsa market and the station's existing financial difficulty as making the purchase attractive. Channel 41 Associates went as far as to have the new call sign KKTO approved for the station.

In 1985, the FCC's must-carry rules, requiring cable systems to carry the signals of local broadcast stations, was struck down by a federal appeals court. Tulsa Cable Television, the leading cable system in the city, dropped KGCT-TV from its lineup on April 14, 1986, except for the station's carriage of St. Louis Cardinals baseball games. The cable company justified its decision as based on KGCT's low ratings. In an interview with Broadcasting magazine, system president Mark Savage called the station a "very run-of-the-mill" independent and said, "They didn't have any ratings. They probably still don't." The lack of cable carriage played into the events surrounding the new Fox Broadcasting Company network's choice of affiliate. When the network launched in October 1986, it had no affiliate in Tulsa, discussing possible terms of affiliation with KOKI and KGCT. Even though KGCT's manager had sent over what he thought was an affiliation contract, Fox claimed it was only a sample agreement. Fox's vice president of affiliate relations, Bob Mariano, spoke highly of a possible affiliation with KOKI and told the Tulsa World, "Our problem at the moment with KGCT is that it is not carried on Tulsa Cable." In August 1987, Fox agreed to affiliate with KOKI.

The loss of programming (from the end of the Christian television lease) and cable carriage slowed the station's prospects for growth. General manager Bob Davis noted that it took more than 18 months to put the station back on its feet, and even then, the lack of cable carriage and poor-quality programming limited channel 41's appeal. One exception was in the area of sports, where the station aired multiple pro sports packages as well as network sports telecasts that the local affiliates refused to air. Sports telecasts were frequently KGCT's highest-rated programs.

=== 1989 shutdown ===
Satellite Syndicated Systems, aside from owning KGCT-TV, was also the operator of cable's Satellite Program Network. In 1986, SSS rebranded as Tempo Enterprises and changed the name of SPN to Tempo Television. The next year, Tempo Enterprises agreed to be purchased by the largest owner of cable systems in the United States, Tele-Communications Inc. Tempo's two TV stations and one radio station were put up for sale. The company turned over its ownership stake to Green Country Television that December.

Tempo's departure from KGCT's ownership prompted Green Country to seek outside buyers. Armstrong Investments, the sole owner of Green Country, had run out of money to fund the station due to a down oil market, and Tempo had been financing station expenses. Three offers had emerged by January 1989, all of them seeking to significantly relaunch the station with a new image. As a result, after showing its late-night movie on the morning of February 1, 1989, KGCT-TV left the air for what was announced as a 30-day evaluation period for the various offers. All 15 station employees were given a leave of absence benefits package. KOKI acquired the rights to several programs previously seen on KGCT, including a package of Kansas City Royals baseball games. By April, Green Country was in negotiations with a single buyer. In July 1989, an application was filed with the FCC to transfer the license to Tulsa TV 41 Corporation, owned by Dennis Lisack of Louisville, Kentucky. The deal never closed; Davis noted that several buyers struggled to finance the acquisition.

== Modern history ==
=== KTFO: Return to the air and UPN affiliation ===
In 1990, Green Country sold KGCT to RDS Broadcasting Inc., headed by Robert Rosenheim, Douglas Bornstein, and Richard Kaylor, for $157,500. The initials represented Rosenheim, Douglas, and a company known as Synchronal. Over the course of May 1991, the station returned to the air as KTFO (Tulsa Forty-One). Again programmed as a conventional independent, KTFO was—like KGCT-TV—not on Tulsa's cable system. After an initial plan to lease time on one of the educational access channels programmed by Tulsa Public Schools fell through, a revised version was agreed, and on March 30, 1992, KTFO was made available to Tulsa cable subscribers from 5 p.m. to 8 a.m. weekdays and all day on weekends. In 1993, KTFO received full-time cable carriage. KTFO offered local programming including a local pregame show for Texas Rangers baseball, Out of Left Field, as well as the talk shows Oklahoma Forum and Open Line, both of which were hosted by former KJRH news anchor Sam Jones.

RDS Broadcasting signed a local marketing agreement (LMA) with KOKI-TV and its owner, Clear Channel Television, on November 3, 1993. Clear Channel assumed programming and operational duties for the station, brought it under the control of KOKI's general manager, and hired 11 of its 14 employees. New programming, such as Perry Mason, M*A*S*H, ALF and Star Trek, and more current movies were added as part of the LMA. In January 1994, Clear Channel committed KTFO to affiliate with a new national network, UPN, which launched in January 1995. RDS sold KTFO and another station it owned but Clear Channel managed, WTEV-TV in Jacksonville, Florida, in 1997 to MGA Broadcasting, a company owned by Van H. Archer III. In 1999, the FCC legalized duopolies—the outright ownership of two broadcast licenses in a market—and Clear Channel acquired KTFO from MGA. In 2002, Clear Channel consolidated its television duopoly and its five-station Tulsa radio cluster in a new building at 2625 South Memorial Drive.

=== KMYT: MyNetworkTV ===
Station logo used from 2006 to 2026 (although the updated logo was first used around 2016, it was only seen on promos and local promotions).

In January 2006, The WB and UPN announced they would merge to form The CW. Tulsa's WB affiliate, KWBT, was announced as the CW affiliate for the market in April, and KTFO affiliated with MyNetworkTV, a new network set up by Fox Television Stations to serve stations not chosen for The CW. Ahead of the change in networks, KTFO changed its call sign to KMYT-TV on August 21, 2006, and began branding as My41.

Clear Channel announced the sale of its television station portfolio to Newport Television, controlled by Providence Equity Partners, for $1.2 billion (equivalent to $1.79 billion in 2025) on April 20, 2007. The sale was made so Clear Channel could refocus around its radio, outdoor advertising and live event units. The sale received FCC approval on December 1, 2007; after settlement of a lawsuit filed by Clear Channel owners Thomas H. Lee Partners and Bain Capital against Providence to force the deal's completion, consummation took place on March 14, 2008.

In March 2012, Providence Equity Partners announced it was seeking a buyer for the Newport Television stations. Four months later, it announced the sale of most of the stations, with Cox Media Group acquiring Newport's stations in Tulsa and Jacksonville. Cox also owned five Tulsa radio stations. Cox Media Group was acquired in 2019 by Apollo Global Management. In 2022, it sold KMYT-TV, KOKI-TV and 16 other stations to Imagicomm Communications, an affiliate of the parent company of the INSP cable channel, for $488 million in 2022. Imagicomm sold seven of the stations, including KMYT-TV and KOKI-TV, to Todd Parkin's Rincon Broadcasting Group in 2025.

Sinclair Broadcast Group, owner of KTUL in Tulsa, entered into various agreements with Rincon on February 1, 2026, including an option it exercised that month to buy KMYT-TV for $4.125 million. The agreements also saw the Fox affiliation move to a subchannel of KTUL. The sale was completed on April 14.

== Technical information and subchannels ==
KMYT-TV broadcasts from a transmitter in Coweta. The station's signal is multiplexed:

Subchannels of KMYT
Subchannel	Res.	Short name	Programming
41.1	720p	KMYT-DT	Main KMYT-TV programming
41.2	480i	CoziTV	Cozi TV
41.3	480i	StartTV	Start TV
41.4	480i	H&I	Heroes & Icons
41.5	480i	MeToons	MeTV Toons

=== Analog-to-digital conversion ===
KMYT-TV shut down its analog signal, over UHF channel 41, on February 17, 2009, the original digital television transition date. Though the transition deadline for all stations had been deferred to June 12, Newport opted to transition KMYT-TV and leave KOKI-TV, with its news programming, available in analog until June. The station's digital signal remained on its pre-transition UHF channel 42, using virtual channel 41. KMYT-TV relocated its signal from channel 42 to channel 34 in September 2018 as a result of the 2016 United States wireless spectrum auction.
