= KDZA-TV =

Television station in Pueblo, Colorado (1953–1954)

- Pueblo, Colorado; United States
- Channels: Analog: 3 (VHF)

Programming
- Affiliations: CBS, NBC, DuMont

Ownership
- Owner: Dee B. Crouch

History
- First air date: March 19, 1953
- Last air date: May 7, 1954

Technical information
- ERP: 16.5 kW
- HAAT: 138 m (454 ft)

KDZA-TV (channel 3) was a television station in Pueblo, Colorado, United States, which broadcast from March 19, 1953, to May 7, 1954. It was the first television station established in Pueblo. The station shut down due to financial difficulties, competition from a second station in Pueblo and two outlets in Colorado Springs, and network affiliation changes in Denver that affected its main programming source.

== History ==
In May 1952, Dee B. Crouch, the owner of Pueblo radio station KDZA (1230 AM), announced that his station was preparing an application to broadcast on channel 3, newly assigned to the city by the Federal Communications Commission (FCC). The Pueblo Radio Company applied in June and was awarded a construction permit on November 13.

After erection of a 405-foot (123 m) tower at the studio on Pueblo's north side, KDZA-TV began test broadcasts on March 14, 1953, and started its regular programming on March 19. Much of its programming, including network fare, was fed to it by a 104-mile (167 km) microwave relay between Pueblo and KFEL-TV (channel 2) at Denver. The station held affiliations with the CBS, NBC, and DuMont networks. KDZA also broadcast syndicated shows from Ziv Television Programs.

Gene O'Fallon, who owned KFEL-TV, filed to buy KDZA radio and television from Crouch for $350,000, including the assumption of $100,000 in payments to DuMont Laboratories for the channel 3 transmitter, at the end of July. Four months later, O'Fallon dropped the deal, though KDZA-TV continued taking programs from KFEL-TV, including live basketball games. The move came as KFEL-TV lost both of its major network affiliations in the final quarter of 1953 to new Denver outlets KLZ-TV (CBS) and KOA-TV (NBC) and after a second Pueblo television station, KCSJ-TV (channel 5), began broadcasting as an NBC affiliate.

Ultimately, continued operation and program feeds from Denver proved uneconomical to continue. On May 7, 1954, channel 3 went silent to repair its equipment, but by then it was an open secret that the station was in financial woes. It never returned, opting not to ask the FCC for continued authority to remain silent, and its construction permit expired on September 22, 1954. KDZA-TV was the third VHF station to close completely for economic reasons, after KFXD-TV in Nampa, Idaho, and KFOR-TV in Lincoln, Nebraska, which had shut down in August 1953 and March 1954, respectively.

The channel 3 allocation was moved to Alamosa in 1955 at the petition of KCSJ-TV, which intended to build a satellite station there. No full-power station ever appeared on the channel, but a translator of KRDO-TV was authorized to use it in December 1965. The full-power allocation was shifted from Alamosa to Glenwood Springs in January 1980 upon the petition of Western Slope Communications, which built and signed on KCWS there in 1984.
