= Travis Meyer (meteorologist) =

American meteorologist

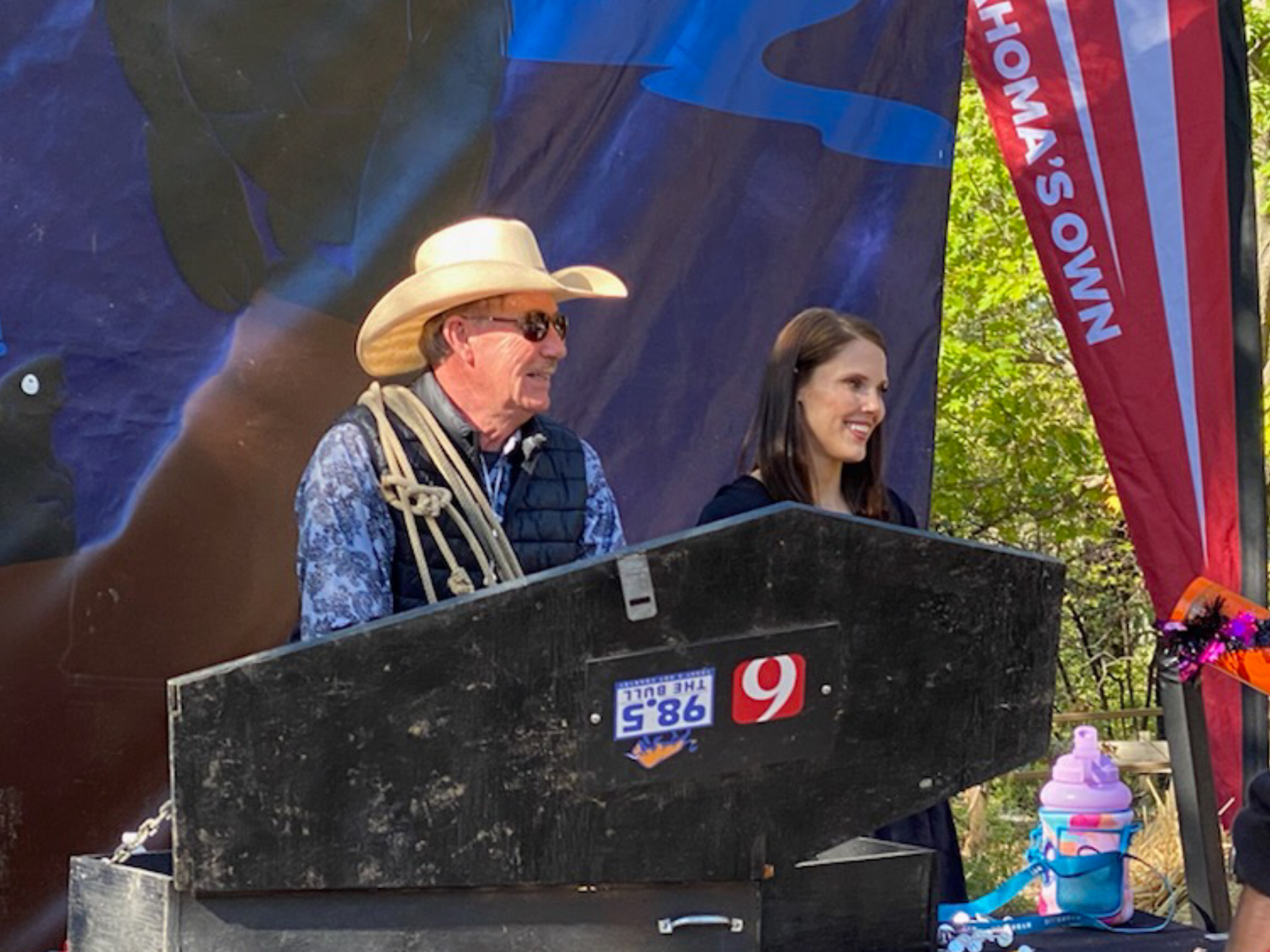
- Meteorologist Travis Meyer at the Tulsa Zoo October 31, 2021
- Occupation: Meteorologist

Travis Meyer is chief meteorologist at the Tulsa News Station KOTV, Channel 6. He transferred from another Tulsa station, KTUL, Channel 8. Meyer has been on television in Tulsa for more than 25 years providing weather information to the people of eastern Oklahoma. When Meyer switched to KOTV Channel 6, he would eventually fill the spot of veteran and much respected meteorologist Jim Giles.

== Awards & Recognitions ==
In 2019, Oklahoma Governor Kevin Stitt designated Travis Meyer the 2019 Community Legacy Honoree for 'outstanding service to the Tulsa community' and 'hard work and strong character well deserving of special recognition.'
