= List of Detroit Lions broadcasters =

The following is a list of broadcasters for the Detroit Lions, both past and present.

== Radio ==
=== Current ===
The Lions' flagship radio station is WXYT-FM 97.1. The broadcast team includes Dan Miller on play-by-play, Lomas Brown on color commentary, and T. J. Lang as sideline reporter.

The team moved back to WXYT after having been on WJR since the 2016 NFL season, which followed a 20-year relationship with WXYT. The decision to part with WXYT was reportedly instigated by a demand by the team for the station to fire on-air personality Mike Valenti—who has had a history of making comments critical of the Lions during his drive-time show—as a condition of any future renewal. A CBS Radio spokesperson stated that their refusal was meant to maintain the station's integrity.

=== Former ===
WXYT (AM) was the sole flagship station from 1998 - 2004. WKRK-FM (later WXYT (AM)) became the co-flagship in 2004.

Detroit's WWJ Newsradio 950 was the team's flagship station from 1989 to 1998 and continued to simulcast WXYT (AM)'s broadcasts prior to the team's move to WKRK. Prior to 1989, WJR had served as the Lions' radio flagship.

== TV ==
=== Current ===
==== Preseason ====
As of 2015, WJBK is the flagship station. The announcers are Jason Benetti, TJ Lang with color commentary, and Tori Petry with sideline reports. The late Fred McLeod was once a play-by-play TV broadcaster on Lions pre-season.

==== Regular season ====
Regular season games are broadcast regionally on FOX, except when the Lions play an AFC team in Detroit, in which case the game airs regionally on CBS. The annual Thanksgiving Day game in Detroit is televised nationally on either Fox or CBS, depending on the year.

The Lions' official regular season show of record is Lions GameDay Live with Dan Miller hosting.

For regular season games vs. NFC opponents when Fox doesn't have a double header, WJBK produces a live postgame show.

For Thursday Night Football and NFL Network games, WJBK is the local broadcaster of record. For Monday Night Football, WXYZ is the authorised broadcaster unless they decline, which WJBK has often broadcast Monday games when WXYZ declines.

=== Former ===
WKBD was the preseason flagship station from 1992–1996 and from 2004-2007. WDIV and WJBK have served as flagships at various times.

WWJ-TV was the flagship station from 2008-2010.

WJBK (channel 2) has been the Fox affiliate in Detroit since December 1994, before that it was a CBS affiliate, and as such, WJBK for many years has served as the primary station for most Lions games. For much of 1994, while WJBK was waiting for its CBS affiliation contract to expire, the Lions games were shown on WKBD-TV (at the time owned by Viacom, now owned by CBS as a sister to WWJ-TV), with the last game being the December 10 game against the New York Jets, on WKBD's last day as a Fox affiliate.

Interconference home games were first televised in 1973 (when the NFL first imposed the 72-hour deadline), and for 25 years these were seen on NBC, with WDIV (channel 4, originally WWJ-TV) airing the games locally. The current WWJ-TV (originally on analog channel 62) has aired such games since 1998 when the AFC contract moved to CBS.

Fox Sports Detroit formerly produced a live postgame and Monday press conference show called Lions Live. It was canceled after the 2007 season.

=== Blackouts ===
The Lions' winless performance in 2008 and 2–14 season in 2009 led to several local broadcast blackouts, as local fans did not purchase enough tickets by the 72 hour blackout deadline. In 2008, five of the Lions' final six home games of the season did not sell out, with the Thanksgiving game being the exception. The first blackout in the 7-year history of Ford Field was the October 26, 2008, game vs. the Washington Redskins. The previous 50 regular season home games had been sellouts.

Games were also often blacked out at the Lions' previous home, the 80,000 seat Pontiac Silverdome, despite winning seasons and the success and popularity of star players such as Barry Sanders.

== Announcers by year ==
=== Television ===
Year	Play-by-play	Analyst(s)	Field reporter(s)
2001	Dan Miller		
2002	Dan Miller		
2003	Dan Miller		
2004	Frank Beckmann	Chris Spielman	
2005	Frank Beckmann		
2006	Frank Beckmann	Kelvin Pritchett	Steve Courtney
2007	Frank Beckmann	Erik Kramer	Steve Courtney
2008	Gus Johnson	Desmond Howard	Matt Shepard; Charlie Sanders
2009	Matt Shepard	Desmond Howard	Charlie Sanders; Steve Courtney
2010	Matt Shepard	Rob Rubick	Charlie Sanders; Steve Courtney
2011	Matt Shepard	Rob Rubick	Tom Leyden
2012	Matt Shepard	Rob Rubick	Tom Leyden
2013	Matt Shepard	Rob Rubick	Tom Leyden
2014	Matt Shepard	Rob Rubick; Herman Moore	Tom Leyden
2015	Matt Shepard	Rob Rubick; Nate Burleson	Jennifer Hammond
2016	Matt Shepard	Chris Spielman	Jennifer Hammond
2017	Matt Shepard	Chris Spielman	Jennifer Hammond; Tori Petry
2018	Matt Shepard	Chris Spielman	Tori Petry
2019	Fred McLeod	Chris Spielman	Tori Petry
2020	No preseason games due to the COVID-19 pandemic		
2021	Brandon Gaudin	Herman Moore	Dannie Rogers
2022	Brandon Gaudin	Devin Gardner	Dannie Rogers
2023	Jason Ross Jr	Devin Gardner	Dannie Rogers
2024	Jason Ross Jr	Devin Gardner	Dannie Rogers
2025	Jason Benetti	TJ Lang	Dannie Rogers

=== Radio ===
Year	Play-by-play	Analyst(s)	Field reporter(s)	Studio team
1975	Bob Reynolds	J. P. McCarthy		
1976	Bob Reynolds	Mike Lucci		
1977	Bob Reynolds	Mike Lucci		
1978	Bob Reynolds	Mike Lucci		
1979	Bob Reynolds	Frank Beckmann		
1980	Bob Reynolds	Frank Beckmann		
1981	Bob Reynolds	Frank Beckmann		
1982	Bob Reynolds	Frank Beckmann		
1983	Frank Beckmann	Charlie Sanders		
1984	Frank Beckmann	Charlie Sanders		
1985	Frank Beckmann	Charlie Sanders		
1986	Frank Beckmann	Charlie Sanders		
1987	Frank Beckmann	Charlie Sanders; Jim Brandstatter		
1988	Frank Beckmann	Charlie Sanders; Jim Brandstatter		
1989	Mark Champion	Jim Brandstatter		
1990	Mark Champion	Jim Brandstatter		
1991	Mark Champion	Jim Brandstatter		
1992	Mark Champion	Jim Brandstatter		
1993	Mark Champion	Jim Brandstatter		
1994	Mark Champion	Jim Brandstatter		
1995	Mark Champion	Jim Brandstatter		
1996	Mark Champion	Jim Brandstatter		
1997	Mark Champion	Jim Brandstatter		
1998	Mark Champion	Jim Brandstatter		
1999	Mark Champion	Jim Brandstatter		
2000	Mark Champion	Jim Brandstatter		
2001	Mark Champion	Jim Brandstatter	Tony Ortiz	
2002	Mark Champion	Jim Brandstatter	Tony Ortiz	
2003	Mark Champion	Jim Brandstatter	Tony Ortiz	
2004	Mark Champion	Jim Brandstatter	Tony Ortiz	
2005	Dan Miller	Jim Brandstatter	Tony Ortiz	
2006	Dan Miller	Jim Brandstatter	Tony Ortiz	
2007	Dan Miller	Jim Brandstatter	Tony Ortiz	
2008	Dan Miller	Jim Brandstatter	Tony Ortiz	
2009	Dan Miller	Jim Brandstatter	Tony Ortiz	
2010	Dan Miller	Jim Brandstatter	Tony Ortiz	
2011	Dan Miller	Jim Brandstatter	Tony Ortiz	Gavin Edwards
2012	Dan Miller	Jim Brandstatter	Tony Ortiz	
2013	Dan Miller	Jim Brandstatter	Tony Ortiz	
2014	Dan Miller	Jim Brandstatter	Tony Ortiz	
2015	Dan Miller	Jim Brandstatter	Tony Ortiz	
2016	Dan Miller	Jim Brandstatter		
2017	Dan Miller	Jim Brandstatter		
2018	Dan Miller	Lomas Brown		
2019	Dan Miller	Lomas Brown		
2020	Dan Miller	Lomas Brown		
2021	Dan Miller	Lomas Brown	T. J. Lang	Jim Costa

Other:

- Van Patrick called play-by-play from 1950 until his death in 1974.
