= Top-rated United States television programs of 1959–60 =

This table displays the top-rated primetime television series of the 1959–60 season as measured by Nielsen Media Research.

Rank	Program	Network	Rating
1	Gunsmoke	CBS	40.3
2	Wagon Train	NBC	38.4
3	Have Gun – Will Travel	CBS	34.7
4	The Danny Thomas Show	CBS	31.1
5	The Red Skelton Show	CBS	30.8
6	Father Knows Best	CBS	29.7
6	77 Sunset Strip	ABC	29.7
8	The Price Is Right	NBC	29.2
9	Wanted: Dead or Alive	CBS	28.7
10	Perry Mason	CBS	28.3
11	The Real McCoys	ABC	28.2
12	The Ed Sullivan Show	CBS	28.0
13	The Rifleman	ABC	27.5
14	The Ford Show	NBC	27.4
15	The Lawman	ABC	26.2
16	Dennis the Menace	CBS	26.0
17	Cheyenne	ABC	25.9
18	Rawhide	CBS	25.8
19	Maverick	ABC	25.2
20	The Life and Legend of Wyatt Earp	ABC	25.0
21	Mr. Lucky	CBS	24.4
21	Zane Grey Theater	CBS	24.4
21	General Electric Theater	CBS	24.4
24	The Ann Sothern Show	CBS	24.2
25	Alfred Hitchcock Presents	CBS	24.1
26	You Bet Your Life	NBC	24.0
27	What's My Line?	CBS	23.9
28	I've Got a Secret	CBS	23.5
29	The Perry Como Show	NBC	23.1
29	Lassie	CBS	23.1
