= KCEB (Oklahoma) =

Television station in Tulsa, Oklahoma (1954)

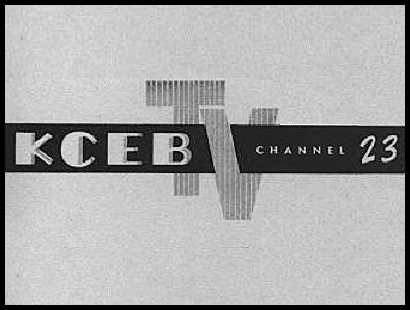
- Tulsa, Oklahoma; United States
- Channels: Analog: 23 (UHF)

Programming
- Affiliations: ABC (March–September 1954); NBC (March–December 1954); DuMont (March–December 1954)

Ownership
- Owner: Elfred Beck

History
- First air date: March 13, 1954
- Last air date: December 10, 1954; (272 days)
- Call sign meaning: Reversal of owner's last name

KCEB (channel 23) was a television station in Tulsa, Oklahoma, United States, which was affiliated with NBC, ABC and the DuMont Television Network. Owned by Elfred Beck, the station operated for almost nine months from March 13 to December 10, 1954.

== History ==
The station was founded by Tulsa oilman Elfred Beck. KCEB (which Beck named after himself as a reversal of his last name) began construction of its studio facilities atop Lookout Mountain in west Tulsa on August 21, 1953.

The station signed on the air on March 13, 1954 as the second television station to sign on in the Tulsa market. It originally operated as an affiliate of NBC and the DuMont Television Network; it also shared ABC programming with primary CBS affiliate KOTV (channel 6), which signed on 4 1/2 years earlier in October 1949. The station was outfitted with the latest equipment.

As electronics manufacturers were not required to include UHF tuners on television sets at the time, (Note: The United States Congress passed the All-Channel Receiver Act into law in 1961, requiring UHF tuners in all new sets by 1964. That came too late for many UHF stations who ceased operations during the 1950s and early 1960s due to a lack of wide reception. In June 1954, 82 UHF television stations were broadcasting in the United States, of which 24 were still on-air by the following year.) early commercial UHF TV pioneers struggled. At one point, an estimated 100,000 UHF converters had been sold to Tulsa residents by local electronics retailers (which accounted for about 40% of all households with a set in the area). Nonetheless, NBC (which, like CBS, preferred to seek VHF affiliations) reached an agreement with KOTV that allowed that station to continue "cherry-picking" stronger shows, leaving less content available for KCEB to broadcast.

Soon after KCEB signed on, the Federal Communications Commission (FCC) issued a construction permit to Central Plains Enterprises (run by a group of businessmen led by Robert S. Kerr, William G. Skelly and Dean A. McGee), owners of local radio station KVOO (1170 AM, now KOTV), for the market's second commercial television station. KVOO-TV (channel 2, now KJRH-TV) signed-on December 5, 1954. NBC cancelled its affiliation agreements with KCEB (and later KOTV) months before channel 2's initial sign-on, moving its entire programming schedule to an exclusive contract with that station.

Beck then struck a contract with ABC to make it a primary affiliation, but ABC continued to reserve the right to give KOTV right of first refusal on carriage of all programs. (Note: In the 1950s, CBS and NBC dominated over-the-air television. Third-ranked ABC struggled, with much of the early content sponsor-controlled, created by ad agencies or produced on a low budget. The network likely only survived the 1950s due to an injection of equity from United Paramount Theatres, along with the fourth-ranked DuMont Television Network's 1956 demise eliminating the only other notable contender. See https://uhfhistory.com/documents/Silverman_Thesis_ABC.pdf for an overview.)

The situation rapidly grew worse for the station. The Tulsa Broadcasting Company, majority owned by grocery magnate John Toole Griffin, signed on Muskogee-licensed KTVX (channel 8, now KTUL) as the new ABC affiliate on September 18, 1954, taking all of the remaining ABC programs.

This left KCEB with some NBC programming (which it was rapidly losing) and DuMont (the nation's fourth-rated television network). DuMont's days as a network operation were numbered due to a lack of advertising revenue. Most of the network's programming was dropped by April 1, 1955; the network ceased operations in August 1956.

As a last-ditch move, Beck decided to cut back KCEB's operations to a limited four-hour-a-day program schedule in October 1954, relying on filmed programming and NBC programs; the move failed to increase viewership and revenue, resulting in Beck deciding to sign off the station for the last time on December 10, 1954 — five days after Tulsa's third commercial VHF TV station went on-air. Four months later on April 5, 1955, Beck sold the KCEB studios and the 40-acre property surrounding it atop Lookout Mountain to the Tulsa Broadcasting Company, to house the facilities of KTVX. Channel 8 initially used the site as an auxiliary studio, before obtaining FCC approval to move channel 8 from Muskogee to Tulsa in November 1955 under the new call letters KTUL-TV to match its sister radio station KTUL (1430 AM, now KTBZ).

=== Brief revival ===
Beck retained the construction permit for the channel 23 allocation; upon notice from the Federal Communications Commission in 1965, Beck was ordered to return the station to the air by April 11, 1966 or surrender the construction permit to the Commission. Beck sought outside investment in order to bring the station back on, with Beck selling 65% control of the station to local jeweler Ernest Moody holding and a 25% interest to Claude Hill (owner of radio station KOCW-FM (97.5, frequency now occupied by KMOD-FM)), while Beck retained the remaining 10%. The station briefly returned to the air in September 1967 as an independent station. The station also leased space at the then-recently completed Fourth National Bank Building, to house its transmitter facilities atop the building and to operate studio facilities on the 29th floor of the building. Broadcasting between six and seven hours a day, programming on the station at that time consisted primarily of movies and syndicated programming; plans also called for a nightly primetime newscast at 9 p.m., editorials, and forum-formatted public affairs programs.

=== Post-shutdown ===
A group of prominent corporate executives and community leaders in the Tulsa area, known as "Tulsa 23, Ltd." (led by managing partner Benjamin F. Boddie and investors that included former Williams Companies CEOs John H. Williams and Charles P. Williams, who were also responsible for the redevelopment in downtown Tulsa including the establishment of the Williams Center, the Bank of Oklahoma Tower and the Tulsa Performing Arts Center), was awarded a new station license on UHF channel 23 in early 1980. The group signed on the new station, KOKI-TV, as an independent station on October 23, 1980. KOKI affiliated with the Fox Broadcasting Company when that network launched in October 1986; the station (which was owned by Atlanta-based Cox Media Group from 2012 to 2022) launched a news department in February 2002 under the ownership of Clear Channel Communications, and gradually converted to a news-intensive schedule (carrying 48 hours of newscasts each week as of 2014), in addition to airing sitcoms, drama series, talk and court shows.
