= List of television stations in Oklahoma =

This is a list of broadcast television stations that are licensed in the U.S. state of Oklahoma.

== Full-power ==
- Stations are arranged by media market served and channel position.

Full-power television stations in Oklahoma
Media market	Station	Channel	Primary affiliation(s)	Notes	Refs
Oklahoma City	KFOR-TV	4	NBC		
Oklahoma City	KOCO-TV	5	ABC		
Oklahoma City	KWTV-DT	9	CBS		
Oklahoma City	KETA-TV	13	PBS		
Oklahoma City	KTBO-TV	14	TBN		
Oklahoma City	KOKH-TV	25	Fox		
Oklahoma City	KTUZ-TV	30	Telemundo	(Note: Licensed to Shawnee, Oklahoma.)	
Oklahoma City	KOCB	34	Independent		
Oklahoma City	KUOK	35	Univision, UniMás on 35.2	(Note: Licensed to Woodward, Oklahoma.)	
Oklahoma City	KAUT-TV	43	The CW		
Oklahoma City	KOCM	46	Daystar	(Note: Licensed to Norman, Oklahoma.)	
Oklahoma City	KSBI	52	MyNetworkTV		
Oklahoma City	KOPX-TV	62	Ion Television		
Strong City	KWET	12	PBS	(Note: Licensed to Cheyenne, Oklahoma.) (Note: Satellite of KETA-TV.)	
Tulsa	KJRH-TV	2	NBC		
Tulsa	KOTV-DT	6	CBS, The CW on 6.2		
Tulsa	KTUL	8	ABC		
Tulsa	KOED-TV	11	PBS		
Tulsa	KDOR-TV	17	TBN	(Note: Licensed to Bartlesville, Oklahoma.)	
Tulsa	KQCW-DT	19	The CW	(Note: Licensed to Muskogee, Oklahoma.)	
Tulsa	KOKI-TV	23	Fox		
Tulsa	KRSU-TV	35	Educational independent	(Note: Licensed to Claremore, Oklahoma.)	
Tulsa	KMYT-TV	41	MyNetworkTV		
Tulsa	KTPX-TV	44	Ion Television, NBC on 2.11	(Note: Licensed to Okmulgee, Oklahoma.)	
Tulsa	KWHB	47	CTN		
Tulsa	KGEB	53	GEB Network		
~Fort Smith, AR	KOET	3	PBS	(Note: Licensed to Eufaula, Oklahoma.)	
~Sherman, TX	KTEN	10	NBC, The CW on 10.2, ABC on 10.3	(Note: Licensed to Ada, Oklahoma.)	
~Wichita Falls, TX	KSWO-TV	7	ABC, Telemundo on 7.2	(Note: Licensed to Lawton, Oklahoma.)	

== Low-power ==
Low-power television stations in Oklahoma
Media market	Station	Channel	Primary affiliation(s)	Notes	Refs
Altus	K31NA-D	46	Daystar		
Oklahoma City	K17JN-D	17	3ABN	(Note: Licensed to Enid, Oklahoma.)	
Oklahoma City	K32MG-D	19	Silent		
Oklahoma City	KUOT-CD	21	3ABN		
Oklahoma City	KTOU-LD	22	Various		
Oklahoma City	KLHO-LD	26	TV Alabanza		
Oklahoma City	KWRW-LD	33	Various		
Oklahoma City	K35MV-D	35	FNX	(Note: Licensed to Concho, Oklahoma.)	
Oklahoma City	KUOK-CD	36	Univision		
Oklahoma City	KBZC-LD	42	Various		
Oklahoma City	KOHC-CD	45	Various		
Oklahoma City	KOCY-LD	48	Estrella TV		
Tulsa	K30OK-D	10	HSN		
Tulsa	KXAP-LD	14	Estrella TV		
Tulsa	KTUO-LD	22	Various		
Tulsa	KUTU-CD	25	Univision, UniMás on 25.2, Telemundo on 25.3		
Tulsa	KTZT-CD	29	Daystar		
Tulsa	KZLL-LD	39	Various	(Note: Licensed to Joplin, Missouri.)	
Tulsa	K27OB-D	40	3ABN		
Tulsa	KUOC-LD	48	Various		
~Wichita Falls, TX	K34NE-D	43	IBN Television		

== Translators ==
Translator television stations in Oklahoma
Media market	Station	Channel	Translating	Notes	Refs
Altus	K25JO-D	3	KFDX-TV		
Altus	K29LJ-D	3	KFDX-TV		
Altus	KKTM-LD	7	KSWO-TV		
Altus	K27MY-D	9.2	KWTV-DT		
Altus	K36NQ-D	9.2	K27MY-D		
Altus	K32IC-D	18	KJTL		
Altus	K19AA-D	19	KETA-TV		
Alva	K20JD-D	4	KFOR-TV		
Alva	K15HL-D	9	KWTV-DT		
Alva	K22ID-D	25	KOKH-TV		
Alva	K30AE-D	30	KETA-TV		
Alva	K28JX-D	34	KOCB		
Alva	K17ID-D	43	KAUT-TV		
Elk City	K32OF-D	4	KFOR-TV		
Elk City	K22MA-D	5	KOCO-TV		
Elk City	K31JW-D	9	KWTV-DT		
Elk City	K17MK-D	25	KOKH-TV		
Elk City	K34JK-D	34	KOCB		
Elk City	K26NC-D	43	KAUT-TV		
Elk City	K20NJ-D	52	KSBI		
Guymon	K28GI-D	4	KAMR-TV		
Guymon	K26JO-D	7	KVII-TV		
Guymon	K32GD-D	10	KFDA-TV		
Guymon	K30FY-D	14	KCIT		
Guymon	K16AB-D	16	KETA-TV		
Hollis	K34JJ-D	4	KFOR-TV		
Hollis	K18HX-D	5	KOCO-TV		
Hollis	K35KE-D	9	KWTV-DT		
Hollis	K20JB-D	18	KJTL		
Hollis	K26ND-D	25	KOKH-TV		
Hollis	K22LZ-D	43	KAUT-TV		
May–Gage	K20BR-D	4	KFOR-TV		
May–Gage	K25JQ-D	9	KWTV-DT		
May–Gage	K22BR-D	25	KOKH-TV		
May–Gage	K16DX-D	43	KAUT-TV		
May–Gage	K28NU-D	48	KETA-TV	(Note: Licensed to Buffalo, Oklahoma.)	
Oklahoma City	K28NV-D	38	KETA-TV	(Note: Licensed to Ponca City, Oklahoma.)	
Sayre	K23ND-D	4	KFOR-TV		
Sayre	K24MD-D	5	KOCO-TV		
Sayre	K21JN-D	9	KWTV-DT		
Sayre	K16IR-D	25	KOKH-TV		
Sayre	K15HQ-D	34	KOCB		
Sayre	K30JP-D	43	KAUT-TV		
Sayre	K14NY-D	52	KSBI		
Seiling	K18LY-D	4	KFOR-TV		
Seiling	K21MT-D	9	KWTV-DT		
Seiling	K23NH-D	25	KOKH-TV		
Seiling	K36NR-D	34	KOCB		
Seiling	K16LQ-D	43	KAUT-TV		
Strong City	K18LS-D	4	KFOR-TV		
Strong City	K25PG-D	5	KOCO-TV		
Strong City	K27JO-D	9	KWTV-DT		
Strong City	K33NV-D	25	KOKH-TV		
Strong City	K36NV-D	34	KOCB		
Strong City	K29HY-D	43	KAUT-TV		
Strong City	K23IZ-D	52	KSBI		
Tulsa	K15LM-D	19	KQCW-DT	(Note: Licensed to McAlester, Oklahoma.)	
Weatherford	K35MQ-D	4	KFOR-TV		
Weatherford	K21IT-D	5	KOCO-TV		
Weatherford	K14MU-D	9	KWTV-DT		
Weatherford	K36IY-D	25	KOKH-TV		
Weatherford	K28OX-D	52	KSBI		
Woodward	K33JM-D	4	KFOR-TV		
Woodward	K29HZ-D	9	KWTV-DT		
Woodward	K26IS-D	25	KOKI-TV		
Woodward	K14QP-D	34	KOCB		
Woodward	K31JQ-D	43	KAUT-TV		
~Shreveport, LA	K22MT-D	23	KETA-TV	(Note: Licensed to Idabel, Oklahoma.)	
~Sherman, TX	K27MV-D	46	KETA-TV	(Note: Licensed to Durant, Oklahoma.)	
~Wichita Falls, TX	K31MK-D	7	KSWO-TV		
~Wichita Falls, TX	K20MH-D	47	KETA-TV	(Note: Licensed to Duncan, Oklahoma.)	

== Defunct ==
- KCEB Tulsa (1954)
- KLPR-TV Oklahoma City (1966–1967)
- KMPT Oklahoma City (1953–1955)
- KSWB Elk City (1961–1965)
- KTVQ Oklahoma City (1953–1955)
- KVIJ-TV Sayre (1966–1992)

== See also ==
- Oklahoma § Media

== Bibliography ==
- "United States TV Stations: Oklahoma", Yearbook of Radio and Television, New York: Radio Television Daily, 1964, OCLC 7469377 – via Internet Archive
