= KTVQ (Oklahoma City) =

Television station in Oklahoma City (1953–1955)

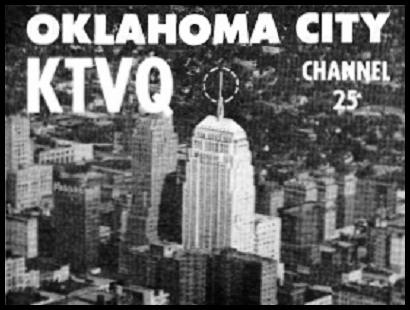
- Oklahoma City, Oklahoma; United States
- Channels: Analog: 25 (UHF)
- Branding: KTVQ Channel 25

Programming
- Affiliations: Defunct

Ownership
- Owner: Republic Television and Radio Company

History
- First air date: November 1, 1953
- Last air date: December 15, 1955; (2 years, 44 days)
- Former affiliations: ABC (1953–1955)
- Call sign meaning: "Television Quality"

KTVQ (channel 25) was a television station in Oklahoma City, Oklahoma, United States, which operated from November 1, 1953, to December 15, 1955. The station was owned by the Republic Television and Radio Company. KTVQ's studios were located on Northwest 19th Street and North Classen Boulevard in northwest Oklahoma City's Mesta Park neighborhood (in a building that presently houses a commercial retail complex), and its transmitter was located atop the First National Bank Building on North Robinson and Park avenues in downtown Oklahoma City.

Two years after the station ceased operations due to financial difficulties that led to KTVQ's bankruptcy, Republic Television and Radio sold the UHF channel 25 license and construction permit to Independent School District No. 89 of Oklahoma County (now Oklahoma City Public Schools) in July 1958; the school district launched a new station on that channel, KOKH-TV, in February 1959.

== History ==
=== Early history ===
On June 26, 1952, the Oklahoma County TV and Broadcasting Company—a Chickasha-based company co-owned by Philip D. Jackson and Clarence E. Wilson, joint owners of Chickasha radio station KWCO (1560 AM, now Oklahoma City-licensed KEBC; the KWCO call letters now reside on a radio station on 105.5 FM in Chickasha)—submitted an application to the Federal Communications Commission (FCC) for a construction permit to build and license to operate a broadcast television station in the Oklahoma City market that would transmit on UHF channel 25. The FCC eventually granted the license to Oklahoma County TV and Broadcasting on February 11, 1953; the group subsequently requested and received approval to assign KTVQ (for "Television Quality") as the call letters for his television station. Subsequently, on April 27, the company's principals reached an agreement to transfer the license and permit to the Republic Television and Radio Company, owned by John Esau (then the stockholder and manager of radio stations KTUL [now KTBZ] in Tulsa and KFPW in Fort Smith, Arkansas), oil prospectors Frank E. Brown, Frank Smith and R. P. Green, and attorney A. C. Saunders. Jackson and Wilson received 12¼% interest in Republic in consideration for the transfer. The FCC granted the permit transfer to Republic Television and Radio on August 5.

KTVQ first signed on the air on November 1, 1953, operating as an ABC affiliate. (Plans originally called for the station to sign on October 1, later pushed back to October 11.) Channel 25 was ABC's first full-time outlet in the Oklahoma City television market and at the time was one of the relatively few ABC-affiliated stations operating on the UHF dial; it assumed the affiliation from primary NBC affiliate WKY-TV (channel 4, now KFOR-TV)—which had continued to carry select ABC programs under a secondary basic affiliation afterward—as it had carried programming from the network since its sign-on in June 1949.

KTVQ was the first television station to sign on in Oklahoma City since the Federal Communications Commission (FCC)-imposed freeze on television broadcast licenses was lifted in 1953. KTVQ was the first of three commercial television station to sign on in the Oklahoma City market during 1953: another UHF station, KMPT (channel 19, later used by Cornerstone Television affiliate KUOT-CD), debuted as a DuMont Television Network affiliate on November 8; KWTV (channel 9) launched as a CBS affiliate on December 20. As with many early UHF stations, reception of KTVQ required television set owners to purchase a standalone UHF tuning adapter. (Set manufacturers were not required to equip televisions with UHF tuners until the Congress passed the All-Channel Receiver Act in 1961, with UHF tuners not included on all newer sets until 1964.) The station conducted a series of promotions to encourage converter adoption including events intended for electronics dealers as well as radio and television commercials directed at the general public.

Local programs on KTVQ included Moods in Music (an innovative music series that utilized projection cards containing song lyrics that were superimposed on-screen, accompanied by a hat pin, acting similarly to the "bouncing ball" seen in singalong versions of movie musicals, moving across the card within the projector), Sidewalk Cafe (a half-hour, weekly variety series featuring instrumental music, interviews and anecdotes, and conducted from a set in the style of a European sidewalk cafe), and sporting events that included Oklahoma A&M Aggies basketball games (which, due to limitations that prevented live broadcasts of away games, aired as pre-filmed telecasts accompanied by separately recorded play-by-play description), local high school football games, and Monday and Tuesday night home games from the now-defunct Oklahoma City Indians minor league franchise. To promote programs scheduled to air on the station, as area newspapers (such as The Daily Oklahoman and the Oklahoma City Times) were not willing to distribute free radio/TV listings logs at the time, KTVQ announced such shows in a format mirroring local children's programs of the period (and was used for a mid-afternoon children's program featured on the station), in which a puppet carried on a conversation with staff announcer Dick Kirchner discussing upcoming KTVQ programs while written program notes rolled past an opening in the back of the stage housing the puppet.

=== Financial troubles and shutdown ===
Along with its existing struggles being a UHF outlet, KTVQ also had to deal with other local stations. WKY-TV had a stronghold on network programming in the market, which Esau contended had exhibited "malicious in [NBC's] monopolistic collusion" with channel 4. In December 1954, Republic Television and Radio filed a petition for bankruptcy reorganization in the United States District Court for the Western District of Oklahoma, citing a lack of adequate working capital and temporary financial difficulties, with an estimated debt load totaling $400,000. Later that month, KTVQ was placed under a trusteeship managed by Esau and attorney Duke Duvall, who were appointed by the court as trustees. The FCC granted transfer of control of Republic Television and Radio to the Esau-Duvall trusteeship on January 11, 1955. As part of the reorganization, National Affiliated Television Stations (NATS)—an organization backed by General Electric and National Telefilm Associates to assist financially struggling television stations with finances, management, programming and advertising services—and ABC agreed to a two-year agreement to provide programming and financial services (including the sale of common stock in the company to Republic stockholders and a one-year equipment payment deference) while the station attempted to emerge from bankruptcy; attorney, oilman and rancher E. A. Farris would also become controlling owner of KTVQ, planning to cancel all debts owed in the station in exchange for the station's common voting stock. ABC's cooperation in the reorganization also intended to substantially increase the number of network programs shown on KTVQ's schedule. The Western District Court approved the reorganization plan in May 1955.

In January 1955, shortly before the FCC proposed rules to limit television transmission antennas from being located more than five miles (8.0 km) from the outskirts of a station's principal city of license, Streets Electronics—owner of Enid-based ABC affiliate KGEO-TV (channel 5, now KOCO-TV)—filed a construction permit application to build a new 1,386-foot (422 m)-tall transmission tower six miles (9.7 km) west-northwest of Crescent. Republic Television and Radio Company charged that KGEO wanted to "straddle" its transmitter between Enid and Oklahoma City to serve both cities, as between 75% and 85% of television set owners in the Enid area owners had oriented their home antennas to receive signals from Oklahoma City and the new tower would provide improved reception in Enid by allowing the signal to propagate into the area at the same direction that these home antennas were aimed, a claim Streets denied. Republic management expressed concern that KGEO's move to the Crescent site would create unfair competition that could hamper the station's already untenable financial situation.

Petitions by Republic Television and Radio to set aside the recommendation to grant of the transmitter application and to reopen the record and call attention to the issues the move would cause was denied by the FCC on December 15, 1955. (The agency later granted the Streets transmitter relocation request in a 6–1 vote on May 4, 1956.) That same day, KTVQ suspended operations under court order from the Western Oklahoma District Court "until a VHF channel [assignment was] made available to it"; the FCC—was considering a proposal to allocate a minimum of three commercial VHF channels in all major markets—did not act on KTVQ's request, resulting in the station being forced to cease transmissions. Station representatives asked the FCC for special temporary authorization to operate on VHF channel 11—which had been assigned to Tulsa as a non-commercial educational allocation—until the Oklahoma Educational Television Authority (OETA) could sign on KOED-TV, a satellite of its Oklahoma City flagship KETA-TV (channel 13), intending to broadcast over the transmitter facility of the then-recently defunct KMPT. Governor Raymond D. Gary was among those who supported the proposal; in contrast, OETA and the Joint Committee on Educational Television filed objections to the request, contending that the proposal was "tantamount to scrapping the whole table of educational television assignments". Sales and acting manager Troy Hoskins stated the station's shutdown had resulted in about 80% of ABC's programming lineup being unavailable to Oklahoma City viewers.

The FCC refused the STA request on February 1, 1956; KTVQ management re-submitted the STA request for channel 11 on May 11, with the intent to operate the station on that channel either through the remainder of the term of the construction permit or until OETA—which had withdrawn its opposition to temporary use of the Tulsa channel—was ready to sign on KOED-TV. The station's fate was ultimately sealed when the request was rejected for the second time on July 5, 1956. ABC programming subsequently returned to WKY-TV as a secondary affiliation (KGEO-TV displaced WKY as the network's Oklahoma City affiliate when it moved its operations and changed its city of license from Enid to Oklahoma City in 1958).

=== Current history of UHF channel 25 in Oklahoma City ===
On July 25, 1958, the Republic Television and Radio Company donated the construction permit and license to Independent School District No. 89 of Oklahoma County (now Oklahoma City Public Schools), while the company was in the midst of protracted hearings regarding KTVQ's bankruptcy. Although the FCC reserved the UHF channel 25 allocation in Oklahoma City for commercial broadcasting purposes, the school district proposed upon acquiring the permit to operate it as a non-commercial educational independent station. The district requested for KOKH-TV—the base of which assigned at the time to its public radio station on 88.9 FM (now KYLV)—to be assigned as the television station's call letters. KOKH signed on the air on February 2, 1959, with programming originally consisting of instructional and lecture-based telecourse programs developed in cooperation with the Oklahoma State Department of Education for college credit attribution.

The school district—citing that operating expenditures outran any benefits and its inability to raise $350,000 in matching funds to replace its existing transmission tower—sold the station for $3.5 million to Blair Broadcasting (a subsidiary of New York City-based John Blair & Co.) on December 14, 1978; Blair later converted KOKH into a general entertainment independent station on October 1, 1979, initially carrying a mix of feature films, cartoons, classic sitcoms, religious programs, some sports programming, and certain network programs preempted by NBC affiliate KTVY (channel 4, now KFOR-TV), ABC affiliate KOCO-TV (channel 5) and CBS affiliate KWTV (channel 9) to carry local or syndicated programming. KOKH became a Fox affiliate on August 15, 1991, as a result of the Oklahoma Educational Television Authority (OETA)'s purchase of the network's Oklahoma City charter affiliate, KAUT (channel 43, now an independent station), which became a PBS member station as a companion to OETA flagship station KETA-TV (channel 13). (As of 2019, KOKH-TV is currently owned by the Sinclair Broadcast Group.)
