= KMPT (TV) =

Television station in Oklahoma City (1953–1955)

- Oklahoma City, Oklahoma; United States
- Channels: Analog: 19 (UHF)

Programming
- Affiliations: DuMont (1953–1955); ABC (1953–1954)

Ownership
- Owner: KLPR Television, Inc.
- Sister stations: Radio: KLPR

History
- First air date: November 22, 1953
- Last air date: February 2, 1955; (1 year, 72 days)

KMPT (channel 19) was a television station in Oklahoma City, Oklahoma, United States, which broadcast from November 22, 1953, to February 2, 1955. It was owned by KLPR Television, Inc., which also owned KLPR radio (1140 AM), and aired programs from both DuMont and ABC. KMPT's studios were located on Southwest 28th and West Commerce Streets in southwest Oklahoma City's Capitol Hill neighborhood, and its transmitter was located on East Britton Road and North Lincoln Boulevard in northeast Oklahoma City.

Forty years after the station ceased operations due to financial difficulties that led to KMPT's bankruptcy, the UHF channel 19 allocation was reassigned to the Equity Broadcasting Corporation, which launched a new station on that channel, K19EA (now Cornerstone Television affiliate KUOT-CD), in March 1995.

== History ==
On December 5, 1952, KLPR Television Inc. – an Oklahoma City-based company co-owned by Byrne Ross (owner of radio station KLPR 1140 AM, now KRMP), Barton Theatres owner R. Lewis Barton, Oklahoma National Bank vice president Lester E. Johnson, plumbing contractor M. E. Nesbitt, dry cleaning businessman R. N. Salmon, Baptist minister Hugh Bumpas (5/2570), attorney Herman Merson, KLPR radio commercial manager Fred M. Farha, and KLPR account executive Monty Wells – submitted an application to the Federal Communications Commission (FCC) for a construction permit to build and license to operate a broadcast television station in the Oklahoma City market that would transmit on UHF channel 19. The FCC eventually granted the license to KLPR Television on February 11, 1953. While the station was known as KLPR-TV at launch, the legal call sign used instead was KMPT, which had been assigned in July. At launch, KLPR-TV programming included DuMont shows and ABC professional football telecasts. The station also made headlines for a unique policy under Ross; not wanting to see his station drive anyone to alcoholism, he refused to accept advertisements from alcoholic beverage companies on the station. That stance, however, only lasted as long as Ross ran the station; on January 26, 1954, he resigned, citing differences with the board of directors, and the station lifted the ban. The station also began using the KMPT call sign in local media at this time.

Within weeks of Ross resigning, and already facing a lawsuit seeking $27,000 from the company that installed the tower, KLPR Television, Inc., filed for bankruptcy, stating it was more than $250,000 in debt. The bankruptcy petition did not affect KLPR radio, but the situation scared off Gordon McLendon, who had been in negotiations to buy a stake in the station, but did not take over management and opted out, finding KMPT "too far gone". On April 27, the FCC approved the transfer of channel 19 to trustee and receiver Everett E. Cotter. The station remained on air until the night of February 2, 1955, the day before a federal judge signed an order to close down KMPT. Creditors blamed KMPT's inability to draw sufficient advertising revenue as the reason for its demise.

Following its shutdown, attempts were made to utilize KMPT's former facilities and channel allocation. The Republic Television and Radio Company proposed utilizing the KMPT transmitter facility to operate ABC affiliate KTVQ (channel 25, allocation now occupied by Fox affiliate KOKH-TV) as part of a proposal to relaunch that station on VHF channel 11, which had been assigned to Tulsa as a non-commercial allocation and was granted to the Oklahoma Educational Television Authority (OETA) for KOED-TV, a planned satellite of its Oklahoma City flagship KETA-TV (channel 13). The proposal was twice denied by the FCC: first on February 1, 1956, and again on July 5, 1956.

On May 3, 1957, movie theater operator Malco Theaters Inc. applied to operate a television station on channel 19. Another application would be filed for the allocation in 1962 by the new owners of KLPR, doing business as KLPR-TV, Inc. The FCC granted the application in 1965, but after an overhaul of UHF allocations nationwide, the new KLPR-TV, which would broadcast in 1966 and 1967, would do so on channel 14.
