= KXON =

KXON may refer to:

- KXON (FM), a defunct radio station (102.9 FM) formerly licensed to serve Ozona, Texas, United States
- KRSU-TV, a television station (channel 32, virtual 35) licensed to serve Claremore, Oklahoma, United States, which held the call sign KXON-TV from 1984 to 1992
- KDLT-TV, a television station (channel 26, virtual 5) licensed to serve Mitchell, South Dakota, United States, which held the call sign KXON-TV from 1972 to 1982
