= KRSU =

KRSU may refer to:

- KRSU (FM), a radio station (88.5 FM) licensed to Appleton, Minnesota, United States
- KRSU-TV, a television station (channel 32, virtual 35) licensed to Claremore, Oklahoma, United States
