= TVQ (disambiguation) =

TVQ is the Brisbane television station of Network Ten in Australia.

TVQ may also refer to:

== Television ==
- TVQ Kyushu Broadcasting, a television station in Fukuoka, Japan
- Télé-Québec, a French-language TV network
- Television Quarterly, a magazine published by NATAS
- KTVQ, station TVQ in region K; a TV station in Billings, Montana, USA
- KTVQ (Oklahoma City), former station TVQ in region K; a defunct TV station in Oklahoma City, Oklahoma, USA
- WTVQ, station TVQ in region W; a TV station in Lexington, Kentucky, USA

== Other uses ==
- Taxe de vente du Québec, the French name for Quebec Sales Tax, the provincial tax on goods and services in Quebec, Canada; and marked on bills and receipts
- Smartwings Slovakia (ICAO airline code TVQ)
