= KAUT-TV =

Television station in Oklahoma City

ATSC 3.0 station
- Oklahoma City, Oklahoma; United States
- Channels: Digital: 19 (UHF); Virtual: 43
- Branding: CW 43 Oklahoma City

Programming
- Affiliations: 43.1: The CW; for others, see § Technical information and subchannels

Ownership
- Owner: Nexstar Media Group; (Nexstar Media Inc.)
- Sister stations: KFOR-TV

History
- First air date: October 15, 1980 (Note: KAUT signed on the air on October 15, when the station commenced offering programming from the VEU subscription television service. The Television & Cable Factbook states September 24 as KAUT's sign-on date, while the Broadcasting & Cable Yearbook lists it as November 3, when daytime programming began.)
- Former call signs: KFHC-TV (CP, 1979–1980); KAUT (1980–1983); KAUT-TV (1983–1992); KTLC (1992–1998); KPSG (1998)
- Former channel numbers: Analog: 43 (UHF, 1980–2009); Digital: 40 (UHF, 2006–2018)
- Former affiliations: Independent (1980–1986, 2012–2023); VEU (1980–1982); Fox (1986–1991); PBS (1991–1998); UPN (1998–2006); MyNetworkTV (2006–2012)
- Call sign meaning: Gene Autry, partner of founding owner Golden West Broadcasters

Technical information
- Licensing authority: FCC
- Facility ID: 50182
- ERP: 750 kW
- HAAT: 467 m (1,532 ft)
- Transmitter coordinates: 35°34′7″N 97°29′21″W

Links
- Public license information: Public file; LMS
- Website: kfor.com/cw43/

KAUT-TV (channel 43) is a television station in Oklahoma City, Oklahoma, United States, serving as the local outlet for The CW. It is owned by Nexstar Media Group alongside NBC affiliate KFOR-TV (channel 4). The two stations share studios in Oklahoma City's McCourry Heights section; KAUT-TV's transmitter is located on the city's northeast side.

KAUT went on the air on October 15, 1980. It was built by Golden West Broadcasters, a company owned by station namesake Gene Autry, and aired Golden West's VEU subscription TV service at night and news programming during the day. The news programming lasted less than a year before being discontinued, while VEU was shuttered in October 1982, leaving KAUT to become one of three independent stations in the market. Rollins Broadcasting bought the station in 1985; it became Heritage Media in 1986, the year that channel 43 affiliated with the Fox network. Fox programming improved the station's ratings, which previously had run third among the three Oklahoma City independents.

After a previous proposal in 1988 and 1989 failed, Heritage Media acquired competing independent KOKH-TV (channel 25) in 1991. It moved the Fox affiliation, programming, and staff from channel 43 to channel 25. KAUT was then donated to the Oklahoma Educational Television Authority (OETA), the state's public TV broadcaster, and revamped as a secondary service known as The Literacy Channel under KTLC call letters. It aired telecourses and literacy programming during the day and reairs of PBS children's programs at night. The Literacy Channel did not receive state money; operating funds came from private donors and the Corporation for Public Broadcasting.

The OETA put KTLC on the market in 1997 to help defray the costs of converting its statewide network to digital broadcasting. Paramount Stations Group placed the winning bid and returned channel 43 to commercial operation as UPN affiliate KPSG on June 20, 1998. The station returned UPN programming to the market after KOCB (channel 34) switched to The WB earlier that year. After Autry died that October, the station reclaimed its original KAUT call sign in his honor. The New York Times Company, then-owner of KFOR-TV, purchased KAUT in 2005; the station affiliated with MyNetworkTV when UPN and The WB merged into The CW in 2006, and KFOR introduced prime time and morning newscasts on channel 43. In 2023, KAUT replaced KOCB as the CW affiliate in Oklahoma City.

== History ==
=== KAUT (1980–1991) ===
==== The STV years ====
The Christian Broadcasting Company of Oklahoma applied to the Federal Communications Commission (FCC) on March 29, 1979, for a construction permit to build a new commercial television station on channel 43 in Oklahoma City. The non-profit corporation proposed a religious-oriented station, similar to KXTX-TV in Dallas. At the time, applications were open on three different Oklahoma City UHF channels—14, 34, and 43—and the Trinity Broadcasting Network (TBN) also sought a religious station using channel 14. Christian Broadcasting Company placed an order for equipment in September 1978 and received the construction permit that November.

In 1979, less than a year after obtaining the permit for KFHC-TV, Christian Broadcasting Company sold the permit to Golden West Broadcasters, a joint venture of Gene Autry and his wife Ina and The Signal Companies. Golden West's intention for the station was to broadcast subscription television (STV) programming to paying subscribers. Golden West was branching into the STV business with microwave distribution systems in other cities; it chose Oklahoma City for the venture because of an initial investment climate and Autry's ties to Oklahoma. The FCC granted approval of the $60,000 transaction on January 24, 1980. The station occupied a 32,500-square-foot (3,020 m^{2}) building constructed on a 95-acre former dairy at 11901 North Eastern Avenue; excess heat from the station's transmitter heated the building, the first setup of its kind in Oklahoma. The call letters KAUT were chosen in honor of Autry.

On October 15, 1980, KAUT began broadcasting Golden West's VEU subscription TV service, featuring first-run motion pictures and other entertainment specials. Subscribers paid $22.50 per month plus a $49.95 installation fee to be connected to the service, which began airing at 7 p.m. In 1981, VEU added sports: a package of Dallas Mavericks basketball games and Oklahoma State Cowboys basketball and wrestling.

During the day, beginning on November 3, 1980, KAUT broadcast an all-news format from noon to 5 p.m. Jerry Birdwell, the first general manager, noted the high interest in news in the Oklahoma City market and stated the objective of the 24-person news operation was to serve as a "newspaper of the air". Bob Barry Jr. was among the on-air staff for KAUT's newscasts. In between, from 5 to 7 p.m., the station aired syndicated programs. For several months in late 1980, the station broadcast TBN programs until KTBO-TV could complete construction on channel 14.

KAUT as a whole struggled to get viewers to understand its hybrid program format and avoid confusion with the all-news cable channel CNN or KGMC (channel 34), a competing independent station. The news window shifted to 2–6 p.m. in early 1981 to expose the Newswatch 43 broadcasts to more viewers; by this time, the station had daytime music videos and programming from the Christian Broadcasting Network (CBN) before going live with news coverage. Viewer acceptance was never high with the notable exception of waiting rooms and places of business, where television ratings are not measured, and the news department was disbanded in August 1981, leaving 15 employees out of a job. Birdwell believed Oklahomans were not ready for "this type of live, extended, locally produced news".

VEU competed with local cable television franchises, some of which were ahead of schedule in connecting neighborhoods to their service, as well as TVQ, a microwave-delivered movie service with about 15,000 subscribers. By May 1982, the VEU service had 18,000 subscribers, surpassing TVQ.

==== Independent station and Fox affiliation ====
With VEU subscriptions in Oklahoma City peaking at 22,000, short of the 35,000 necessary to turn a profit, Golden West decided to terminate operations of the VEU service in Oklahoma City on October 17, 1982, and convert KAUT into a full-time commercial and ad-supported independent station with daytime programs from the Financial News Network. Jerry Birdwell also cited the lack of identity, noting that viewers referred to KAUT as "that cable station". Decoders used for VEU service in the Oklahoma City area were shipped to Golden West's other broadcast STV service in Dallas.

The new format, which emphasized series in prime time instead of movies to provide an alternative to independents KOKH-TV (channel 25) and KGMC, led to the cancellations of two music programs aired by the station. The final edition of TMC 43, a teen dance program, featured 250 guests as the host read letters from heartbroken teens and parents. Also axed was Oklahoma Country Live, a country music show hosted by Wade Carter and noteworthy for featuring the first TV appearance of a young Garth Brooks. KAUT's acquisitions of new syndicated programs were impacted by the station's relatively late entry into program acquisition, putting it behind the network affiliates and the other two local independents.

During the 1980s, KAUT carried a variety of local and regional sports telecasts. In 1982, channel 43 carried college basketball games involving the Oklahoma Sooners, the Oklahoma State Cowboys, and the Oklahoma City Stars as part of a contract with local advertising agency AADCO. For several years in the 1980s, the station aired packages of Oklahoma City 89ers minor league baseball games alongside syndicated telecasts of the Texas Rangers and Kansas City Royals baseball teams and Dallas Mavericks and Houston Rockets basketball.

In 1982, Golden West Broadcasters sold itself to a new firm led by Kohlberg Kravis Roberts as Autry bought out The Signal Companies' interest in other Autry ventures. Golden West was under a divestiture order stemming from the 1980 death of Ina Autry, and in 1985, the station was sold again for $5.55 million to Atlanta-based Rollins Communications, owned by pest control magnate O. Wayne Rollins. Subsequently, in 1986, Des Moines, Iowa–based Heritage Broadcasting acquired a controlling interest in Rollins Communications—with the combined company forming Heritage Media—in a two-tiered tender acquisition worth $260 million.

KAUT became Oklahoma City's affiliate of the new Fox network when it launched with late night programming in October 1986, even though channel 43 was the third-rated of Oklahoma City's three independent stations.

==== 1988 independent consolidation attempt ====
KAUT-TV logo while a Fox affiliate, used from 1989 to 1990

In July 1988, Pappas Telecasting proposed a $30 million triple acquisition that would have resulted in major changes in independent television in Oklahoma City. It proposed to buy KOKH-TV, KGMC, and KAUT-TV; consolidate their programs onto channel 25; and then sell the latter two stations to the Oklahoma Educational Television Authority (OETA) and a religious organization, respectively, removing them as competitors to KOKH. As the OETA Foundation, the charitable fundraising arm of the educational authority, sought funds for the KGMC purchase in addition to a $1 million conditional grant from Pappas, others did not have a favorable reaction. Oklahoma governor Henry Bellmon voiced concerns with the OETA's involvement in the transaction, suggesting that the purchase of a second Oklahoma City station would result in the authority—which had limited appropriations to adequately operate its existing state network as it stood—constantly requesting additional state funding. After a minority broadcaster objected to the rule being used to justify the KGMC purchase, Pappas changed tack and announced in October that KAUT, not KGMC, would be the station sold to the OETA, a plan approved by the authority's board.

Opposition from Bellmon and others to the second channel plan continued after channel 43 was substituted. In a move that hamstrung its attempt to acquire KAUT, the Oklahoma Legislature incorporated stipulations into the bill appropriating OETA's funding for fiscal year 1990 that prohibited the use of state funds "for any operational or capital expense of the proposed second educational television channel in Oklahoma City" and from proposing any additional funding to finance the acquisition if it did not obtain sufficient funding from private sources. In late January 1989, the management of KOKH-TV owner Busse Broadcasting denied Pappas's request to extend the completion deadline for the purchase past its scheduled January 31 deadline. The entire transaction fell through on February 3, when Busse formally terminated the purchase agreement with Pappas; three days earlier, the FCC had dismissed the respective transfer applications for KGMC and KAUT. The proposed OETA sale created uncertainty over KAUT's future, resulting in the departures of 16 KAUT employees (all of whom sought work at other Heritage-owned television stations) and a reduction in advertising sales. Even though channels 34 and 43 struggled in the wake of the declined purchase, KAUT bounced back as the Fox network caught its stride with such hits as The Simpsons, pulling ahead of KGMC in total-day ratings and ahead of KGMC and KOKH in prime time.

=== KTLC, The Literacy Channel (1991–1998) ===
On April 23, 1991, Heritage Media announced that it would acquire KOKH from Busse Broadcast Holdings, move some of KAUT's programming and Fox affiliation to channel 25, and donate the channel 43 transmitter and studio facility to the OETA. The move promised relief for the crowded commercial TV market. It also met with the approval of Governor Bellmon's office, unlike the 1988 Pappas plan.

As KAUT's staff and programming moved over to channel 25, channel 43 relaunched as "The Literacy Channel" on August 15, 1991. The Literacy Channel name had been associated with the project since 1989. The second station allowed the OETA to more than double its offerings of telecourses in an effort to reduce illiteracy in the state, with offerings of such series as Learn to Read and GED on TV. At night, The Literacy Channel offered rebroadcasts of children's shows from PBS, including Sesame Street—never before aired in the evening—and Reading Rainbow. The new programming was a demonstration initiative devised by OETA's Board of Directors, the OETA Foundation Board of Trustees, and Heritage Media; PBS senior vice president for education services Sandy Welch and management with the Children's Television Workshop collaborated with the consortium in the development of the station's new format, which the OETA and PBS intended to use as a model for instructional and educational programming on a national level. The call sign changed from KAUT to KTLC on January 17, 1992.

As the OETA's state budget appropriation shrank, KTLC began altering its program format to save money, even though most of the channel's funding initially came from private sources. In July 1993, weekday and weekend morning schedules were axed, initially temporarily, in response to a 17.9-percent budget cut that left the Literacy Channel with no state funding source. The OETA board requested the OETA Foundation's permission to conduct two on-air fundraisers to keep the Literacy Channel on the air. A nine-day fund drive took place in September. By 1995, half of the funding for the Literacy Channel came from the Corporation for Public Broadcasting and the remainder from private donors, with no state funding. This was the case even though governor David Walters had previously recommended expanding the service, saying, "[W]e need to sell reading and writing like we would sell soap."

=== UPN affiliation (1998–2005) ===
In October 1997, the OETA decided to sell KTLC in order to fund costly digital television conversion mandates for the rest of its statewide network, with the sale proceeds to be placed in an endowment to cover those costs; The Literacy Channel was planned to continue as a cable service and, eventually, a digital subchannel of the OETA transmitters. The authority received ten cash offers for channel 43, among them proposals from Clear Channel Communications, Shop at Home, and Sinclair Broadcast Group. The highest bid, at $23.5 million, was made by Paramount Stations Group, the owned-and-operated stations division of UPN. UPN was about to lose its existing Oklahoma City affiliate: KOCB, the former KGMC. By 1997, it was under the ownership of Sinclair, which that summer signed a deal to flip six UPN affiliates including KOCB to its rival, The WB, in January 1998. The move put UPN on the back foot; the network contested the validity of the action in Maryland courts, where it lost twice. Without any further action, UPN would be left without an affiliate in Oklahoma City.

The OETA unanimously accepted Paramount's $23.5 million bid in January 1998. As part of the deal, for five years, Paramount agreed to air The Literacy Channel programs from 9 a.m. to noon on weekdays; provide the OETA with $100,000 in airtime for promotion; include the OETA in volume discounts for digital television equipment purchases; donate discarded equipment; and simulcast one fundraising drive a year. On June 20, 1998, after delays, UPN returned to Oklahoma City after five months as channel 43 launched a new program schedule under the new call sign KPSG. The full transaction was completed a month later.

Gene Autry died at the age of 91 on October 2, 1998. In his honor, the station re-took the call sign KAUT-TV on December 12, coinciding with a weekend-long special of Autry's films and an hour-long tribute special hosted by his longtime friend, Johnny Grant.

Under Paramount, the station added some sports programming to its lineup. In 2004, it began airing Kansas City Chiefs preseason games as well as a package of Oklahoma Sooners men's and women's basketball games.

=== Duopoly with KFOR-TV (2005–present) ===
In September 2005, the New York Times Company, owner of NBC affiliate KFOR-TV (channel 4), agreed to purchase KAUT from what was then the Viacom Television Stations Group for $22 million. It was one of two stations Viacom agreed to sell in 2005, along with WUPL in the New Orleans market. The deal created the first duopoly in the New York Times Company stable of TV stations.

UPN and The WB merged in September 2006 to form The CW. An Oklahoma City affiliate for the network was not confirmed until Sinclair signed an agreement for eight stations to join the network on May 2. On August 22, just two weeks before the network launched, KAUT confirmed it would be Oklahoma City's affiliate of MyNetworkTV, which was set up to serve affiliates not chosen for the new CW network. Instead of rebranding with the network as "My 43", KAUT changed its moniker to "OK43", adopting Western-themed imaging.

On January 4, 2007, The New York Times Company sold KAUT-TV and its eight sister television stations to Local TV LLC, a holding company operated by private equity firm Oak Hill Capital Partners, for $530 million; the sale was finalized on May 7. Local TV LLC shared broadcast group management with the Tribune Company, by way of The Other Company, run by Tribune executive Randy Michaels.

==== Freedom 43 ====
In 2011, the station rebranded from OK43 to "Freedom 43" in an appeal to the large military population in the Oklahoma City area. KFOR–KAUT president Jim Boyer described the new name and approach as catering to "all Oklahomans who believe in faith, freedom and patriotism". Newscasts on channel 43 were altered to include stories and profiles of interest to conservatives and the military community. KAUT discontinued MyNetworkTV in 2012, with the service's offerings moving to KSBI (channel 52).

Tribune acquired the Local TV stations in 2013 for $2.75 billion. In 2017, Sinclair Broadcast Group attempted to purchase Tribune; to meet ownership limits, Sinclair would have spun out KAUT to Howard Stirk Holdings and operated it under shared services and joint sales agreements. The Tribune purchase of Sinclair and related transactions were nullified on August 9, 2018, after Tribune Media terminated the merger and filed a breach of contract lawsuit; this came several weeks after the FCC voted to bring the deal up for a formal review and lead commissioner Ajit Pai publicly rejected it.

==== Nexstar ownership and CW affiliation ====
Following the collapse of the Sinclair merger, Nexstar Media Group announced it would acquire Tribune Media in a $6.4 billion all-cash deal on December 3, 2018, which also included all outstanding Tribune debt. Approved by the FCC on September 16, 2019, the merger was completed three days later.

KAUT replaced KOCB as the Oklahoma City affiliate of The CW on September 1, 2023, a year after Nexstar bought majority control of the network. The switch in affiliation coincided with Sinclair receiving the CW affiliations in Seattle and Pittsburgh.

== Local programming ==
=== Newscasts ===
After KAUT-TV was purchased by KFOR-TV, the KFOR news department extended to add newscasts on channel 43. A 9 p.m. newscast debuted in June 2006, originally anchored by Ernie Paulson and former KOCO-TV weekend evening anchor Cherokee Ballard. The station also airs a morning news and entertainment program, Rise and Shine.

== Technical information and subchannels ==
The station's ATSC 1.0 channels are carried on the multiplexed signals of three other Oklahoma City TV stations:

Subchannels provided by KAUT-TV (ATSC 1.0)
Channel	Res.	Short name	Programming	ATSC 1.0 host
43.1	1080i	KAUT-DT	The CW	KFOR-TV
43.2	480i	RewTV	Rewind TV	KOKH-TV
43.3	480i	Mystery	Ion Mystery	KOKH-TV
43.4	480i	COZI	Cozi TV	KOCB

=== Analog-to-digital conversion and spectrum repack ===
KAUT-TV launched a digital signal on UHF channel 40 on April 24, 2006. The station originally planned to transmit on UHF channel 42 by the May 1, 2002, deadline for full-power television stations to sign on a digital signal; however, the assignment was also given to KTFO in Tulsa. As a result, Viacom Television Stations Group requested channel 40 for KAUT's digital signal instead. KAUT discontinued regular programming on its analog signal, over UHF channel 43, on February 17, 2009, the original date for the federally mandated digital television transition. The station's digital signal remained on its pre-transition UHF channel 40 until relocating to channel 19 on December 1, 2018, as a result of the 2016 United States wireless spectrum auction.

=== ATSC 3.0 deployment ===
KAUT-TV became the host station for ATSC 3.0 (NextGen TV) broadcasting on October 8, 2020. From its transmitter facility at its studios in the McCourry Heights area of Oklahoma City, KAUT-TV provides 3.0 signals of subchannels of itself and four other Oklahoma City-area stations: KFOR-TV, KOCO-TV, KOKH-TV, and KOCB.

Subchannels of KAUT-TV (ATSC 3.0)
Subchannel	Res.	Short name	Programming
4.1	1080p	KFOR	NBC (KFOR-TV)
5.1	1080p	KOCO	ABC (KOCO-TV)
25.1	720p	KOKH	Fox (KOKH-TV)
34.1	720p	KOCB	KOCB (Independent)
43.1	1080p	KAUT	The CW
