= Oklahoma Passage (miniseries) =

Oklahoma Passage was a 1989 miniseries produced by the Oklahoma Educational Television Authority which dramatized 150 years of the history of Oklahoma. The miniseries was narrated by the character Miz Hannah, played by Jeanette Nolan. Miz Hannah tells the story of her family's history in Oklahoma to her grandchildren. Through the telling of this family history, the history of Oklahoma is played out.

== Cast ==
Each episode was hosted by the following:

Episode 1: Dale Robertson
Episode 2: G.D. Spradlin
Episode 3: Ben Johnson
Episode 4: Hoyt Axton
Episode 5: Astronaut, General Thomas Stafford

The series also featured: Charles Benton, Eldon G. Hallum, Lou Michaels, Melvin Holt, Carter Mullally, Jr., Danny Kamin, Brummett Echohawk, Charles Ballinger, Bryan Bourg, James Fields, Robin Brooks, Chris Todd, Thesa Rogers Loving, Robert Knott, Stephen Gerald, Rex Linn, Whitman Mayo, Megan Mullally, Jonathan B. Reed, Richard Lemin, Paul Newsom, Jeff MacKay, Becky Borg, Vernon Grote, Scott Pruett, Ken Spence, Gene McFall, Tom Ward, Frank Bates, Bret Graham, and Michelle Merchant
