= Ed Birchall =

American clown

Edward P. Birchall
- playing HO-HO
- Born: July 16, 1923; Colchester, Connecticut, US
- Died: July 3, 1988 (aged 64); Oklahoma City, Oklahoma, US
- Occupation: Clown
- Spouse: Beebe Birchall
- Children: 6

Edward Phillips Birchall (July 16, 1923 – July 3, 1988) was known to generations of Oklahomans as HO-HO the Clown.

== Biography ==
Birchall was born on July 16, 1923, of Irish heritage in Colchester, Connecticut, and served in the United States Army Air Forces during World War II. A lover of the circus, he performed as a freelance clown before being hired as an entertainer by KOCO-TV in Oklahoma City. There, he starred in a local children's television show named after him, which typically featured an array of firefighters, police officers, zoo animals, visiting circus clowns and other guests, as well as Pokey the Puppet, played by Bill Howard, the station's long-time stage manager wearing a sock-puppet on his arm. HoHo was all over the KOCO schedule and for much of the 1960s he was on six days a week. Various titles were "HoHo's Showboat", "Lunch With HoHo", "Good Morning HoHo", and "HoHo's Showplace".

HoHo's show was broadcast for 29 years, long after the station was acquired by Gannett, airing in its last years without commercials to fulfill the station's public service requirements. HoHo was a frequent visitor to children's wards at local hospitals. He also appeared at restaurants, charity events, parades, and children's parties, from which Birchall derived most of his income.

Birchall was a diminutive and slightly round man of cheerful spirit and hippie inclinations. Friends remember him as behaving much the same in real life as on his show. He lived in Bethany, Oklahoma, for most of his life, and suffered declining health leading to his death on July 3, 1988, from a heart attack while undergoing cancer treatment. His popularity was so great that it took three funeral services to accommodate all of his well-wishers, the first of which was attended by an honor guard of professional clown friends and was broadcast live by KOCO-TV.
