= KOCO-TV =

Television station in Oklahoma City

- Oklahoma City, Oklahoma (Note: Originally licensed to Enid, Oklahoma; moved to Oklahoma City in 1963.); United States
- Channels: Digital: 7 (VHF); Virtual: 5
- Branding: KOCO 5

Programming
- Affiliations: 5.1: ABC; for others, see § Technical information and subchannels

Ownership
- Owner: Hearst Television; (Ohio/Oklahoma Hearst Television Inc.)

History
- First air date: July 18, 1954
- Former call signs: KGEO-TV (1954–1958)
- Former channel numbers: Analog: 5 (VHF, 1954–2009)
- Call sign meaning: Oklahoma City, Oklahoma

Technical information
- Licensing authority: FCC
- Facility ID: 12508
- ERP: 65.7 kW
- HAAT: 451 m (1,480 ft)
- Transmitter coordinates: 35°33′45″N 97°29′25″W
- Translator(s): see § Translators

Links
- Public license information: Public file; LMS
- Website: www.koco.com

KOCO-TV (channel 5) is a television station in Oklahoma City, Oklahoma, United States, affiliated with ABC and owned by Hearst Television. Its studios and transmitter are located on East Britton Road (Historic Route 66)—between North Kelley and North Eastern Avenues—in the McCourry Heights neighborhood of northeast Oklahoma City.

Channel 5 was originally allocated to Enid, where this station began broadcasting as KGEO-TV on July 18, 1954. An ABC affiliate from its first day, it was owned by Streets Electronics, a consortium including an appliance store owner and a radio station owner, and had studios in Enid and a transmitter east of the city. Under its first three owners, operations of the station shifted south from Enid to Oklahoma City in phases. The tower moved twice—from Enid to Crescent in 1956 and to its present site in 1964. In 1958, the call sign was changed to KOCO-TV and a secondary studio opened in Oklahoma City, and the station was formally redesignated an Oklahoma City outlet in 1963. In its early years, the station produced a number of local non-news programs, including the children's program Ho-Ho the Clown, on air from 1959 to 1988.

Combined Communications Corporation acquired KOCO-TV in 1970. Combined attempted to trade the station in 1977 for WJLA-TV in Washington, D.C., but the deal foundered over concerns related to WJLA's owner, Washington Star Communications. Instead, Combined merged with Gannett in 1979; the new owners built the current studio facility in 1980. During Gannett ownership, the station won two Peabody Awards.

In 1997, KOCO-TV was traded to Argyle Television, which merged with the broadcasting division of the Hearst Corporation to form Hearst-Argyle Television.

== History ==
=== Early history in Enid ===
Channel 5 was allocated by the Federal Communications Commission (FCC) to Enid in April 1952, as it prepared to lift its four-year freeze on new television licenses. That July, the Enid Radiophone Company, owner of radio station KCRC, applied for a construction permit to operate on channel 5. Later that year, Enid businessman George Streets, owner of Streets Electronics Inc., filed a competing application. Among the minority owners of Streets was George E. Failing, owner of competing Enid station KGWA. The applications for the channel were 33rd in line to be processed by the FCC among cities without TV station service as of August 1953. In December 1953, Enid Radiophone dropped its application in exchange for an option to buy a 20-percent interest in Streets Electronics. The merger came at a time when groups often combined interests to speed up the arrival of new stations. The station received approval to use the call letters KGEO-TV ("Greater Enid, Oklahoma").

KGEO-TV had intended to debut on June 15, but high winds delayed construction of the station's 750-foot (230 m) tower, 9 miles (14 km) east of Enid. The station began test broadcasts on July 6, 1954, and began airing regular programming on July 18. It was an ABC affiliate from the start, though several NBC and CBS shows were also on its schedule when it launched. It was the fifth television station to sign on in the Oklahoma City market and the seventh in Oklahoma. KGEO was also the only full-power VHF station to operate in northern Oklahoma. The station's original studios were located at East Randolph Avenue and North 2nd Street in Enid, in a building that previously had been a Streets appliance store. Appliances were moved across the street to clear the existing building for television use. Over its first two years, the station's financial condition deteriorated; between October 1954 and February 1956, revenues fell by roughly half, and the staff was cut from 44 to 30. In 1956, the station signed to become an affiliate of the NTA Film Network, a film distribution service.

=== Transfer to Oklahoma City ===
When KGEO-TV was approved, Oklahoma City was on the southern fringe of its coverage area. Beginning under the Streets group, ownership began to make a concerted effort to relocate channel 5 into the larger Oklahoma City metropolitan area. On January 11, 1955, Streets Electronics applied to construct a new 1,386-foot (422 m) transmission tower near Crescent, about 31 miles (50 km) south-southeast of Enid. The proposal faced opposition from the United States Air Force and Department of Defense (DoD) over aviation safety concerns, but on August 5 the FCC recommended approval, determining that the new site posed less risk than the existing Enid tower and would significantly expand KGEO-TV's coverage, improving reception in both Enid—where most TV antennas were pointed south already—and the Oklahoma City area. On December 15, the Commission denied motions by Republic Television and Radio—owner of KTVQ (channel 25)—to overturn approval of KGEO's transmitter move to Crescent. The FCC approved Streets Electronics's permit change on May 4, 1956, by a 6–1 vote, requiring sufficient tower lighting and markings, and the agency subsequently denied DoD petitions to deny KGEO's permit. KGEO-TV went to a temporary low-power transmission facility in downtown Enid, mounted on the Broadway Tower, during preparations to relocate the antenna by removing it from the existing tower. On October 1, the tower collapsed during preparations to move the transmitter antenna, causing about $140,000 (equivalent to $1.27 million in 2025) in damage. A new antenna was required; RCA happened to be making one for another station on channel 5, which was diverted to KGEO-TV. The new tower went into full-power service on November 16, 1956.

In October 1957, Streets Electronics sold KGEO-TV to the Caster-Robison Television Corporation for $950,000 (equivalent to $8.31 million in 2025) plus the assumption of approximately $500,000 in debt; the FCC approved the sale two months later. Louis E. Caster and Ashley Robison had broadcasting interests in California, Illinois, and Minnesota. After the sale, Caster-Robison became the Cimarron Television Corporation. On March 1, 1958, the station was renamed KOCO-TV to reflect its new secondary city of service, Oklahoma City. Caster-Robison launched a facilities upgrade program involving expansion in Enid and Oklahoma City. Although still licensed to Enid, KOCO built studios in Oklahoma City, first operating from a building on Britton Road before relocating in November to a permanent facility near Northwest 63rd Street and Portland Avenue. One program the station produced was a mock "attack" of KOCO-TV by a United States Marine Corps Reserve unit, complete with footage of the 1956 tower collapse. At the time, the late newscast was limited to a 5-minute capsule that aired at 10:30 p.m., in between Westerns and the late movie.

The FCC denied a request in May 1961 for the station to identify as Enid–Oklahoma City on-air and in license documents. Caster died of a heart attack on May 15, 1960, and the next year, the pair sold Cimarron to the Capital City Investment Corporation for $3 million (equivalent to $24.7 million in 2025). Investors included existing KOCO-TV stockholders P. R. and L. D. Banta; oil businessman John Kirkpatrick; Dean McGee, a minority owner of KVOO-TV in Tulsa; and associates of Caster's in the ownership and operation of WREX-TV in Rockford, Illinois.

During the transaction, the FCC proposed reallocating channel 5 from Enid to Oklahoma City under modified spacing rules as part of a broader deintermixture plan. Though 11 markets were projected to get VHF stations, KOCO-TV was the only operating station specified to be moved. Although the broader plan was rejected in May 1963, the FCC approved allowing KOCO-TV to be reallocated to Oklahoma City so long as it maintained an auxiliary studio in Enid so as to continue serving that city, allowing a short-spacing to KFSA-TV in Fort Smith, Arkansas, so as to retain a good signal in Oklahoma City. It cited the size of Enid relative to Oklahoma City and the possibility of this action to improve the market position of ABC. By this time, the station's service to Enid was mostly in name only: the station had a one-room studio in the Broadway Tower and a telephone answering service in Enid.

In March 1964, KOCO-TV moved to a 1,563-foot (476 m) tower on East Britton Road in northeast Oklahoma City, near other local broadcast stations. The site had been previously occupied by a tower for KMPT (channel 19). The tower was dedicated with two days of ceremonies that included such notable guests as ABC News anchor Howard K. Smith and the husband-and-wife comedy team of Phil Ford and Mimi Hines.

KOCO produced several notable local programs. Oklahoma Bandstand, a teen dance show, was hosted by a young Bob Markley and at one point had higher ratings locally than the networked American Bandstand. A children's show hosted by Ed Birchall as "HoHo the Clown" aired from 1959 until shortly before his death in 1988. Other locally produced programs included The Ida B. Show, Captain Tom's Popeye Theatre, and a local version of Dialing for Dollars. During the 1960s, two station-produced documentaries—Old Hand and the Weevil and Flight to Yesterday—received national airings on ABC. In the area of news, the station introduced the Hickox–Halburnt Report, its most accepted local news effort to that time.

=== Combined Communications ownership ===
In November 1969, Cimarron Television agreed to sell KOCO-TV to Phoenix, Arizona–based Combined Communications Corporation for $6.5 million (equivalent to $43.7 million in 2025). Combined was formed earlier that year through the merger of the KTAR Broadcasting Company (owner of company flagships KTAR-AM-TV in Phoenix) and Eller Outdoor Advertising (a company founded by CCC president Karl Eller). The FCC approved the sale on July 17, 1970, making KOCO-TV Combined's first broadcast property outside of Arizona.

In 1973, Ben Tipton, a former KBYE radio host, joined KOCO as its first African-American on-air personality and the first Black news anchor in the Oklahoma City market. He anchored the weekend newscasts and later created and hosted The Black Review, a weekly public affairs program that aired under various titles from 1976 to 1993. Tipton left the station in 1977 to become a city councilman, with the program remaining on the air with other hosts until its cancellation. In 1978, Combined's final year of ownership, KOCO-TV rebranded as 5 Alive, dropping the Eyewitness News brand it had used for local news. Ratings improved for a time, and KOCO was the first local station to contract a helicopter for newsgathering, an idea that was quickly copied by its local competitors.

On March 31, 1977, Washington Star Communications announced that it would trade its Washington, D.C., station, WMAL-TV, to Combined in exchange for KOCO-TV and $65 million in nonvoting preferred stock in CCC. The firm needed to break up its cross-ownership entanglements in Washington and Lynchburg, Virginia, under a 1975 FCC decision, but it had also promised to engage in good-faith efforts to find minority and women owners for the properties. The transaction initially received FCC approval in January 1978, primarily because the transaction promised to provide a revenue source for the company's ailing Washington Star newspaper. After Star Communications sold The Star to Time Inc. in February 1978, the FCC reconsidered its approval but again cleared the deal in March. However, a court appeal by citizens' groups including the District of Columbia chapter of the National Organization for Women and the National Black Media Coalition delayed the already prolonged transaction.

=== Gannett ownership ===
On May 9, 1978, the Gannett Company announced that it would acquire Combined Communications in a $370 million all-stock deal, which was the largest transaction involving an American media company up to that point. The sale was approved by the FCC and finalized on June 7, 1979. Gannett made significant investment in KOCO, including the construction of a new, 32,500-square-foot (3,020 m^{2}) studio facility at the tower site at 1300 E. Britton Road, which opened in May 1980 at a cost of $5.5 million. The former studio facilities were then used by the start-up Christian TV station KTBO-TV, which began broadcasting in 1981.

On September 25, 1982, Gannett announced that it would sell KOCO to the San Francisco–based Chronicle Publishing Company for $100 million, in exchange for Chronicle's Bay Area flagship station, KRON-TV. The deal was intended to relieve cross-ownership pressures on Chronicle, which owned the TV station and the San Francisco Chronicle newspaper, but was terminated in 1983 after Chronicle management decided to retain ownership of KRON. Gannett retained KOCO-TV when, as part of its 1985 acquisition of the Evening News Association, it was forced to choose between KOCO-TV and that company's KTVY.

Under Gannett, KOCO debuted an hour-long morning newscast, Daybreak, in September 1981. The station's newscasts generally remained in third place, and at one point in 1984 multiple former KOCO employees went to work for KWTV. KOCO began 24-hour programming in May 1990; despite promotions proclaiming a "New Attitude", ratings did not rise.

In 1982, KOCO-TV and Gannett News Service presented a multi-part report, Oklahoma Shame, which examined abuses in the state's juvenile detention facilities run by the Oklahoma Department of Human Services. The report led to the resignation of agency director Lloyd Rader and earned a Peabody Award. KOCO, along with KFOR-TV and KWTV, earned a joint Peabody for their coverage of the Oklahoma City bombing in April 1995. It was the first Peabody given to a group in 30 years.

=== Argyle and Hearst ownership ===
In July 1995, Gannett agreed to acquire Multimedia, Inc. for $1.7 billion (equivalent to $3.28 billion in 2025). Multimedia owned cable television systems serving 110,000 subscribers in 17 Oklahoma City suburbs, and cross-ownership of cable systems and broadcast TV stations was barred at the time. Further, at the time—with the Telecommunications Act of 1996 still in Congress—Gannett would have owned too many TV stations. The FCC approved the merger on December 1, 1995, and gave Gannett 12 months to dispose of KOCO-TV as well as WLWT-TV in Cincinnati, where Gannett owned The Cincinnati Enquirer.

On November 20, 1996, Gannett announced it would trade KOCO-TV and WLWT to San Antonio-based Argyle Television Holdings II for WZZM in Grand Rapids, Michigan; WGRZ in Buffalo, New York; and $20 million. This deal was approved by the FCC on January 27, 1997, and finalized January 31. When Argyle made the trade with Gannett, it was already up for sale because, per company president Bob Marbut, it could not grow fast enough to become a consolidator in the industry. On March 27, 1997, two months after closing on the swap, Argyle agreed to merge its television holdings with those of the Hearst Corporation. The merger received FCC approval on June 2, 1997, and was finalized in August, forming the publicly traded Hearst-Argyle Television. The acquisition marked Hearst's return to the Oklahoma City market, where it had sold KOMA radio in 1938. In 2009, the Hearst Corporation acquired Argyle's stake in Hearst-Argyle, took it private, and renamed it Hearst Television.

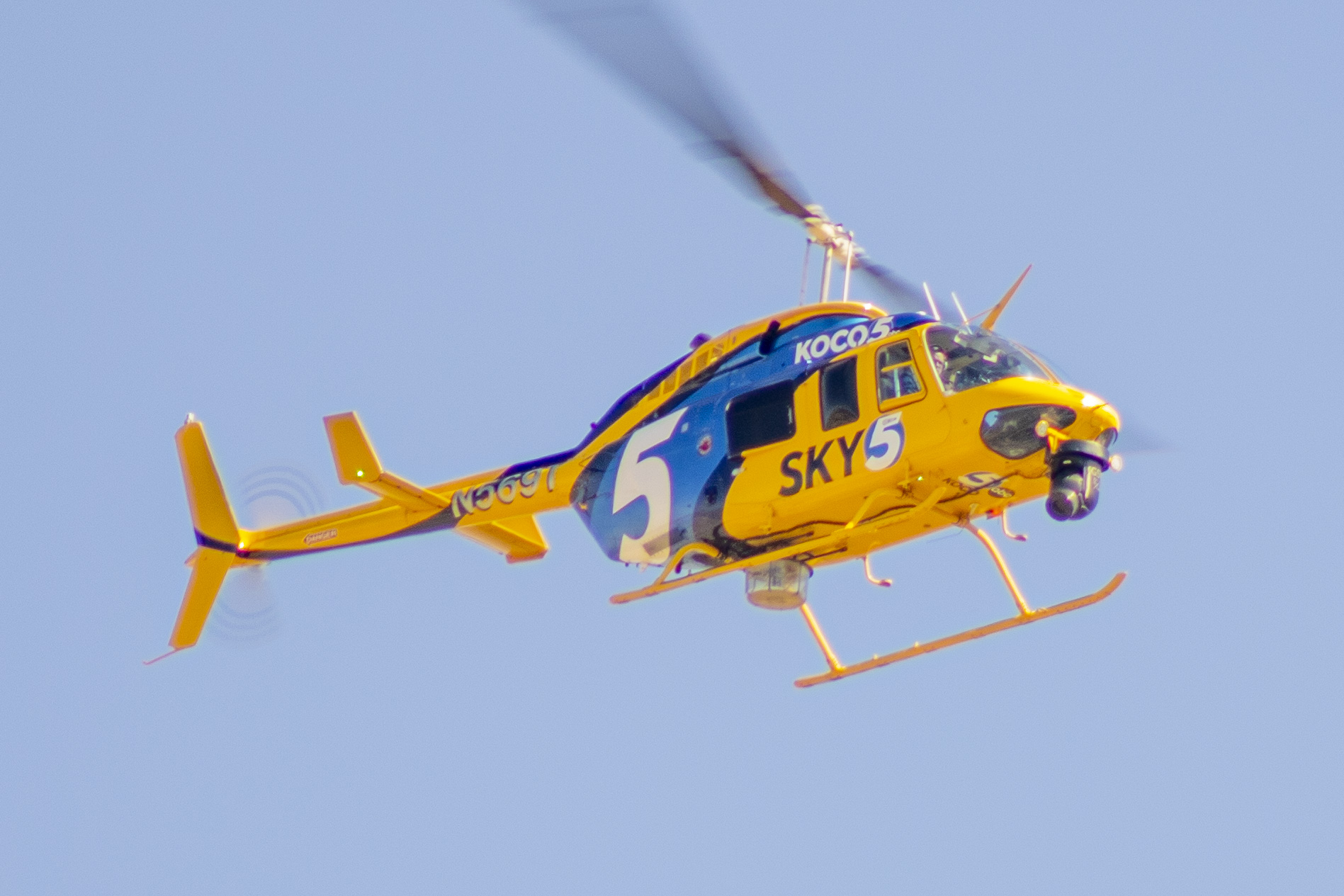
Sky 5 helicopter as seen in 2022

On June 13, 1998, winds nearing 105 mph (169 km/h) damaged KOCO's Britton Road studio during live coverage of a severe thunderstorm that produced multiple tornadoes across northern Oklahoma. The radome covering the station's Doppler weather radar was dented, and the station lost power, unable to broadcast except via a direct feed to local cable systems.

The station saw an increase in its early evening news ratings in the mid-2000s, benefiting from the lead-ins of Dr. Phil and The Oprah Winfrey Show to draw viewers to its 5 and 6 p.m. newscasts. However, KWTV and KFOR continued to have the top-rated late newscasts, and KOCO remained third in annual revenue. By 2011, the station was expanding its news offerings to include a 4:30 a.m. half-hour of its morning newscast and 8 a.m. newscasts on Saturdays and Sundays. By 2022, the station was third in late news ratings among households but second among viewers aged 25–54.

== Notable former staff ==
- Ed Birchall (also known as "Ho Ho the Clown") – children's television personality, 1959–1988
- Dean Blevins – sports director, 1988–1994
- Mick Cornett – sports anchor, 1981–1996; morning news anchor/reporter, 1996–1999
- Kelly Crull – sports anchor and reporter, 2000s
- Bill Geddie – janitor and news photographer, 1977–1979
- Jane Jayroe – anchor/reporter, 1978–1980 and 1987–1992
- Ben McCain – weekday morning anchor (1987–1994)
- Butch McCain – weekday morning meteorologist, 1987–1994
- Rick Mitchell – chief meteorologist, 1994–2012
- Mike Morgan – chief meteorologist, 1989–1992
- Chad Myers – weekend evening meteorologist, –1991
- Karie Ross – sportscaster, 1982–1984
- Milissa Rehberger – weekday morning and noon anchor/reporter, 1997–2000

== Technical information and subchannels ==
KOCO-TV's transmitter is located with its studios on East Britton Road in northeast Oklahoma City. The station's signal is multiplexed:

Subchannels of KOCO-TV
Subchannel	Res.	Short name	Programming
5.1	1080i	KOCO-HD	ABC
5.2	480i	KOCO-ME	MeTV
5.4	480i	Story	Story Television
5.5	480i	Outlaw	Outlaw
5.6	480i	getTV	Great
5.7	480i	Quest	Quest

KOCO-TV began transmitting a digital television signal on VHF channel 7 on November 1, 2002. The station ended regular programming on its analog signal on June 12, 2009, as part of the digital television transition. The station's digital signal remained on its pre-transition VHF channel 7, using virtual channel 5. After the switchover, the marginal reductions to the broadcast radius of KOCO's digital signal created some reception gaps in parts of central Oklahoma. In May 2010, the digital antenna was moved to the top of the tower to help extend KOCO's signal reception to the affected areas.

KOCO-TV is a participating station in Oklahoma City's deployment of ATSC 3.0 (NextGen TV), which began on October 8, 2020.

=== Translators ===
KOCO-TV extends its over-the-air coverage area through the following translators:

- Hollis: K18HD-D
- Weatherford: K21IT-D
- Elk City: K22MA-D
- Sayre: K24MD-D
- Strong City: K25PG-D
