= KTBO-TV =

Television station in Oklahoma City

- Oklahoma City, Oklahoma; United States
- Channels: Digital: 15 (UHF); Virtual: 14

Programming
- Affiliations: 14.1: TBN; for others, see § Subchannels

Ownership
- Owner: Trinity Broadcasting Network; (Trilogy Genesis, Inc, d/b/a Trinity Broadcasting of Oklahoma City, Inc.)

History
- First air date: March 6, 1981
- Former channel numbers: Analog: 14 (UHF, 1981–2009)
- Former affiliations: Dark (2020–2021)
- Call sign meaning: Trinity Broadcasting Oklahoma

Technical information
- Licensing authority: FCC
- Facility ID: 67999
- ERP: 700 kW
- HAAT: 358 m (1,175 ft)
- Transmitter coordinates: 35°34′35″N 97°29′10.5″W

Links
- Public license information: Public file; LMS
- Website: www.tbn.org

KTBO-TV (channel 14) is a religious television station in Oklahoma City, Oklahoma, United States, owned by the Trinity Broadcasting Network (TBN). The station's transmitter is located near the John Kilpatrick Turnpike/Interstate 44, on Oklahoma City's northeast side.

== History ==
The channel 14 allocation in Oklahoma City was first assigned to KLPR-TV, which operated from May 31, 1966, to December 1967, as an independent station.

KTBO-TV first signed on the air on March 6, 1981, broadcasting from the former studios of KOCO-TV (channel 5) on Northwest 63rd Street. Channel 14 was the first station that was built from the ground up and signed-on by TBN, and also the fourth overall station in the network (after flagship station KTBN-TV in Santa Ana, California, KPAZ-TV in Phoenix and WHFT-TV in Miami). The current channel 14 (as KTBO) operates under a different license and has never claimed KLPR-TV as part of its history. The station's opening was marked with a live broadcast of TBN's flagship program Praise the Lord, with network co-founders Paul and Jan Crouch throwing a ceremonial switch to mark the beginning of TBN's operations in Oklahoma.

In September 1989, KTBO engaged in a campaign encouraging viewers to call local cable providers Cox Communications (which served Oklahoma City proper) and Multimedia Cablevision (which served most of the city's suburbs before its Oklahoma systems were acquired by Cox in 1999) and tell them to protest premium cable channel Cinemax's broadcast of Martin Scorsese's The Last Temptation of Christ, which had garnered controversy among the religious community a year before for its depiction of Jesus Christ in an alternate reality after being tempted by what he later discovers to be Satan in the form of a beautiful child (particularly for depicting Christ imagining himself engaged in sexual activities). Although Multimedia responded by blacking out all of Cinemax's broadcasts of the film, Cox refused to preempt the broadcasts and briefly dropped KTBO from its lineup.

On October 27, 2020, KTBO's 1,175-foot (358 m) transmission tower, as well as a radio transmitter owned and operated by TBN, collapsed due to significant freezing rain accumulation created by a severe early-season ice storm that crippled much of Central Oklahoma; ice accumulations on the tower contributing to the collapse were observed to be around 3 inches (76 mm). TBN filed a special temporary authority request on November 5, asking to be allowed to remain dark for 180 days while it seeks a temporary transmitter facility from which it can resume broadcasts until the Hefner Road tower is rebuilt. In January 2021, KTBO resumed over-the-air transmission of its TBN programming under a temporary leasing agreement with The Edge Spectrum, Inc., relayed in standard definition over the second digital subchannel of KUOT-CD (channel 21). KTBO resumed over-the-air broadcasts via its new transmission tower on September 18, 2021.

== Technical information ==
=== Subchannels ===
KTBO-TV began transmitting a digital television signal on UHF channel 15 on December 1, 2002. The station's signal is multiplexed:

Subchannels of KTBO-TV
Channel	Res.	Short name	Programming
14.1	720p	TBN HD	TBN
14.2	720p	TVDEALS	Infomercials
14.3	480i	Inspire	TBN Inspire
14.4	480i	ONTV4U	OnTV4U (infomercials)
14.5	480i	POSITIV	Positiv

TBN-owned full-power stations permanently ceased analog transmissions on April 16, 2009.
