= KOCB =

Television station in Oklahoma City

- Oklahoma City, Oklahoma; United States
- Channels: Digital: 33 (UHF); Virtual: 34
- Branding: KOCB

Programming
- Affiliations: 34.1: Independent; for others, see § Subchannels

Ownership
- Owner: Sinclair Broadcast Group; (KOCB Licensee, LLC)
- Sister stations: KOKH-TV

History
- First air date: November 1, 1979
- Former call signs: KGMC (1979–1990)
- Former channel numbers: Analog: 34 (UHF, 1979–2009)
- Former affiliations: Independent (1979–1995); UPN (1995–1998); The WB (1998–2006); The CW (2006–2023)
- Call sign meaning: "Oklahoma City Broadcasting"

Technical information
- Licensing authority: FCC
- Facility ID: 50170
- ERP: 900 kW
- HAAT: 457.6 m (1,501 ft)
- Transmitter coordinates: 35°32′58.2″N 97°29′19.1″W
- Translator(s): see § Translators

Links
- Public license information: Public file; LMS
- Website: kocb.com

KOCB (channel 34) is an independent television station in Oklahoma City, Oklahoma, United States. It is owned by Sinclair Broadcast Group alongside Fox affiliate KOKH-TV (channel 25). The two stations share studios and transmitter facilities on East Wilshire Boulevard and 78th Street on the city's northeast side.

Channel 34 began broadcasting as KGMC on November 1, 1979. It was majority-owned by the General Media Corporation of Rockford, Illinois, and the second of three new independent stations to begin broadcasting in Oklahoma City over a twelve-month period. For most of the 1980s, KGMC was the second-rated independent in the market behind KOKH. Ted Baze, the general manager and minority owner, became sole owner in 1983 before selling a majority stake to Ivan Boesky, who was later penalized for insider trading. This led to a Federal Communications Commission investigation into the station's broadcast license, ushering in several years of ownership uncertainty for the station. During this time, an attempt to consolidate Oklahoma City's independent stations fell through, with proposals for two separate buyers for channel 34 failing to materialize. The station went into Chapter 11 bankruptcy reorganization, during which rival independent KAUT and KGMC's lender threatened to foreclose and take the station off the air.

The station changed its call sign to KOCB in June 1990 and emerged from bankruptcy in March 1991 under Baze. The ownership of Superior Communications, from 1993 to 1996, brought upgraded programming and an affiliation with UPN upon its January 1995 launch. Sinclair Broadcast Group entered Oklahoma City by buying KOCB in 1996; the station switched to The WB in 1998 as part of a group agreement, and Sinclair began managing KOKH-TV that year. KOCB affiliated with The CW upon the merger of UPN and The WB in 2006, but the network moved to KAUT in 2023 at the same time Sinclair gained CW affiliations in two other markets.

== History ==
=== Construction and early years ===
In 1977, two groups filed before the Federal Communications Commission (FCC) for channel 34 in Oklahoma City. The first was Rockford, Illinois–based General Media Corporation on January 24. On April 12, a second application was filed by Oklahoma City Broadcasting, Inc., whose majority owner was Ted Baze, then manager of WPHL-TV. General Media and Oklahoma City Broadcasting reached a settlement agreement, under which the former owned 80 percent of the combined group, and won the construction permit in March 1979. The new station took the call sign KGMC and built studios on NE 85th Street.

After a series of technical difficulties, KGMC began broadcasting on November 1, 1979. Baze, a baseball fan, attempted to add KGMC to the Philadelphia Phillies television network, but after one game, he was denied; Major League Baseball ruled that Oklahoma City was outside the team's television territory, forcing him to substitute the Houston Astros and later the Texas Rangers.

KGMC formed part of an independent stations boom in Oklahoma City in 1979 and 1980. Oklahoma City had quickly gone from being the largest market with no independent to having three of them. KOKH-TV (channel 25) had relaunched as a commercial independent the month before, and KAUT debuted on channel 43 in October 1980. Baze later cited KAUT's entrance into the market for soaring programming costs that "destroyed everything here for all of the stations". As a result, the market was suddenly saturated in its boom years, and unlike in other Oklahoma industries, the number of stations did not decrease through the state's economic downturn.

General Media Corporation began to liquidate its assets in late 1982. That December, Oklahoma City Broadcasting bought out General Media's share of channel 34 in a deal that valued KGMC at $7 million and was finalized in April 1983. Four months later, Baze agreed to sell an 85-percent interest in the station to the Beverly Hills Hotel Corporation (owned by New York City financier Ivan Boesky) for $7 million, a transaction the FCC approved in December 1983.

=== The Boeskys and a buyout attempt ===
In November 1986, Ivan Boesky agreed to pay a $100 million financial penalty for insider trading and stock fraud. The next month, it was revealed that in September, Boesky had transferred direct control of KGMC to his wife, Seema, without FCC approval; under voting trusts, Ivan Boesky controlled more of the company than previously known. The FCC designated a routine renewal of the station's broadcast license for review in January 1987. The Boeskys and Baze pleaded with the FCC to let the transaction stand, noting that the former had infused $5 million of cash into a station that still had yet to turn a profit. The commission ignored their appeals and designated the license renewal for hearing in November 1987 on the unauthorized transfer of control issue. The Boesky family began to pursue a buyer for channel 34 under the FCC's distress sale policy, which permitted a station facing possible revocation of its license to a group that was minority-controlled. The sale had to be made at a price substantially below the station's market value. Two attempts to find a qualified minority-owned broadcaster fell through when the aspiring purchasers could not secure financing.

KGMC's distress sale attempt was rolled into a much larger package that proposed sweeping changes to independent television in Oklahoma City. In July 1988, Pappas Telecasting proposed a $30 million triple acquisition. It would buy KOKH-TV, KGMC, and KAUT-TV; consolidate their programs onto channel 25; and then sell the latter two stations to the Oklahoma Educational Television Authority (OETA) and a religious organization, respectively, removing them as competitors to KOKH. As the OETA Foundation, the charitable fundraising arm of the educational authority, sought funds for the KGMC purchase in addition to a $1 million conditional grant from Pappas, others did not have a favorable reaction. Oklahoma governor Henry Bellmon voiced concerns with the OETA's involvement in the transaction, suggesting that the purchase of a second Oklahoma City station would result in the authority—which had limited appropriations to adequately operate its existing state network as it stood—constantly requesting additional state funding. One issue specific to KGMC was the use of the distress sale. The National Black Media Coalition objected, while Bellmon noted that the OETA Foundation did not qualify as a minority broadcaster under distress sale provisions. In light of these objections, Pappas changed tack and announced in October that KAUT, not KGMC, would be the station sold to the OETA, a plan approved by the authority's board.

On November 1, 1988, Ohio–based Maddox Broadcasting Corporation, run by media executive Chesley Maddox, announced it would buy KGMC for $3.6 million, consisting of $2.6 million of physical plant assets to Maddox and $1 million in studio equipment and property to Pappas. Pappas's role was described as providing financing assistance and purchasing excess equipment. The deal was contingent on a new plan by Pappas to buy KAUT and KOKH, consolidate their programs on channel 25, and donate channel 43 to the OETA. Opposition from Bellmon and others to the second channel plan continued after channel 43 was substituted. In a move that hamstrung its attempt to acquire KAUT, the Oklahoma Legislature incorporated stipulations into the bill appropriating OETA's funding for fiscal year 1990 that prohibited the use of state funds "for any operational or capital expense of the proposed second educational television channel in Oklahoma City" and from proposing any additional funding to finance the acquisition if it did not obtain sufficient funding from private sources. In late January 1989, the management of KOKH-TV owner Busse Broadcasting denied Pappas's request to extend the completion deadline for the purchase past its scheduled January 31 deadline. The entire transaction fell through on February 3, when Busse formally terminated the purchase agreement with Pappas; three days earlier, the FCC had dismissed the respective transfer applications for KGMC and KAUT.

=== Bankruptcy reorganization ===
The collapse of the second Pappas deal hurt KGMC considerably. Prior to 1988, channel 34 had reliably been the second-place independent station in Oklahoma City, behind KOKH but ahead of KAUT. Baze later told The Daily Oklahoman that, with a purchase close at hand, the station had ceased competing as vigorously, and KAUT pushed past it in the ratings. After the deal fell apart, on February 9, 1989, KGMC filed for Chapter 11 bankruptcy protection; the company had $5.5 million in assets against $14.2 million in liabilities. in May, Baze filed to purchase the station out of bankruptcy. During bankruptcy, KGMC operated under a cash collateral agreement with its secured creditor, NCNB Texas, which held the station's assets as collateral. The bankruptcy case became tortuous after NCNB Texas objected to Oklahoma City Broadcasting's reorganization plan, which had already received the support of the official committee of unsecured creditors. NCNB Texas had signed an option contract with KAUT pledging $3 million for the station's assets if it were to be liquidated. It requested that the value of KGMC's assets be fixed at $3.25 million. The judge overseeing the case, John TeSelle, denied a motion to foreclose on the assets because there was still a chance of a successful reorganization of the business. TeSelle set a lower valuation, finding that KAUT wanted to take KGMC off the air and strengthen its market position. With the case pending, KGMC changed its call sign to KOCB in September 1990 as part of a reset of the station's visual look and programming.

After an attempt to attract outside investment failed due to the pending proceedings and poor local market, Oklahoma City Broadcasting filed a new reorganization plan in November 1990. NCNB Texas objected to the new plan, which it said reduced its claim too much and falsely alleged that NCNB supported it. In March 1991, a reorganization plan was approved for Oklahoma City Broadcasting under which most creditors' claims would be paid in full.

=== Superior Communications ownership and UPN affiliation ===
The sale of KOCB from Oklahoma City Broadcasting to Pittsburgh-based Superior Communications, Inc., owned by broadcasting executives Al Holtz and Perry Sook, was announced in May 1993. The $11 million transaction received FCC approval in October and closed on January 28, 1994; Baze stepped down as general manager and was replaced by Sook.

Under Sook and Superior, the station revamped its on-air look, upgraded its syndicated programming inventory, and acquired telecast rights to Oklahoma Sooners men's basketball. The improved programming also helped KOCB secure cable carriage in localities on the fringe of the market such as Woodward and Altus. Sook described KOCB as the company's flagship and the larger revenue producer of its two stations. As early as November 1993, KOCB was signed up to become an affiliate of a new network proposed by Paramount Television for a 1995 launch; the United Paramount Network (UPN) launched on January 16, 1995, with KOCB as its first local affiliate. At launch, UPN only programmed on Monday and Tuesday nights.

=== Sinclair acquisition and duopoly with KOKH-TV ===
Sinclair Broadcast Group acquired Superior Communications' two stations, KOCB and WDKY-TV in Lexington, Kentucky, on March 4, 1996, for $63.5 million.

On July 21, 1997, Sinclair signed an affiliation agreement with The WB to switch the affiliations of KOCB and four other UPN affiliates to the network. The move put UPN on the back foot; the network contested the validity of the action in Maryland courts, where it lost twice. The affiliation switch left UPN without an Oklahoma City affiliate beginning in January 1998; this changed after the Paramount Stations Group acquired channel 43 from the OETA, with the station relaunching as KPSG in June 1998. (Note: Channel 43 reverted to the call sign KAUT-TV on December 12, 1998, after founding owner Gene Autry's death two months prior.)

In July 1998, Sinclair began managing KOKH-TV under a time brokerage agreement, similar to a local marketing agreement. The company and KOKH had been related since Sinclair's 1997 acquisition of the broadcast division of Heritage Media, but at the time, it could not own KOKH and KOCB. KOKH was spun off to Sullivan Broadcast Holdings for $60 million, only for Sinclair to buy Sullivan in February 1998. Sinclair then had KOKH-TV transferred to Glencairn, Ltd., whose operating arrangements and closeness with Sinclair led to petitions against its acquisitions of stations Sinclair proposed to run. After the FCC legalized duopolies in November 1999, Sinclair filed to buy KOKH-TV and other stations it programmed directly. Approval was held up by Glencairn-related petitions; while the FCC approved the Sullivan deal in December 2001, it fined Sinclair $40,000 after determining it controlled Glencairn in violation of the agency's local ownership rules.

When the Oklahoma Lottery began telecasting live nightly drawings in 2005, KOCB and KOKH were jointly awarded broadcast rights for the Oklahoma City market.

=== CW affiliation and loss ===
Former logo as a CW affiliate

In 2006, The WB and UPN were shut down and replaced with The CW, which offered programming from both predecessor networks. However, Sinclair was late to sign an agreement with The CW. The news of the merger resulted in Sinclair announcing, two months later, that most of its UPN and WB affiliates would join MyNetworkTV, a new service formed by the News Corporation, which was also owner of the Fox network. Sinclair did not agree to terms with The CW, for KOCB and several other stations, until May 2, 2006; KAUT, which had just been sold to The New York Times Company, agreed to affiliate with MyNetworkTV less than two weeks before the network launched.

KOCB's analog signal was shut down on February 17, 2009, as part of the transition from analog to digital television; the station's digital signal remained on pre-transition UHF channel 33, utilizing virtual channel 34.

During Sinclair's attempted purchase of Tribune Media, by then the owner of KFOR and KAUT, Sinclair intended to retain KFOR and KOCB, divest KOKH to Standard Media, and sell KAUT to Howard Stirk Holdings; this and all related transactions were nullified in July 2018 after increased scrutiny by the FCC of the original deal, which Tribune terminated.

As part of a groupwide deal between Sinclair and Nexstar Media Group—owner of KAUT since 2019 and majority owner of The CW since 2022—CW programming was transferred to KAUT on September 1, 2023, with KOCB becoming an independent. The switch in affiliation coincided with Sinclair receiving the CW affiliations in Seattle and Pittsburgh.

Since 2024, KOCB has broadcast Sunday home games of the Oklahoma City Comets, the Triple-A affiliate of the Los Angeles Dodgers.

== Subchannels ==
KOCB's transmitter facility is located on East Wilshire Boulevard and 78th Street on the northeast side of Oklahoma City. The station's signal is multiplexed:

Subchannels of KOCB
Subchannel	Res.	Short name	Programming
34.1	720p	KOCB	Main KOCB programming
34.2	480i	ROAR	Roar (4:3)
34.3	480i	Comet	Comet
34.4	480i	Dabl	Dabl
43.4	480i	COZI	Cozi TV (KAUT-TV)

Broadcast on behalf of another station

== Translators ==
KOCB extends its over-the-air coverage area through the following translators. None are owned by Sinclair; the licenses for all are held either by Oklahoma Community Television or Nexstar.

- Cherokee–Alva: K28JX-D
- Elk City: K34JK-D
- Sayre, etc.: K15HQ-D
- Seiling: K36NR-D
- Strong City: K36NV-D
- Woodward, etc.: K14QP-D
