= KLPR-TV =

Television station in Oklahoma City (1966–1967)

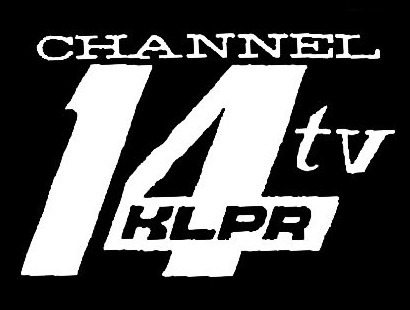
- Oklahoma City, Oklahoma; United States
- Channels: Analog: 14 (UHF)
- Branding: KLPR-TV Channel 14

Programming
- Affiliations: Independent (1966–1967)

Ownership
- Owner: Big Chief Broadcasting Company; (KLPR-TV, Inc.)
- Sister stations: Radio: KLPR

History
- First air date: May 31, 1966
- Last air date: December 1967

Technical information
- Transmitter coordinates: 35°23′14″N 97°29′57″W

KLPR-TV (channel 14) was a television station in Oklahoma City, Oklahoma, United States. The station was owned by Big Chief Broadcasting Company alongside KLPR radio (1140 AM, now KRMP).

KLPR-TV was the second television station in Oklahoma City to be known as such. In November 1953, a previous "KLPR-TV", also associated with the radio station, had started up on channel 19. That station's actual call sign was KMPT; it would go dark in February 1955.

== History ==
KLPR-TV, Inc., filed with the Federal Communications Commission (FCC) for a new television station on channel 19 at Oklahoma City—the same allocation used by the former KLPR-TV/KMPT—in 1962. The company, owned by KLPR radio owners Jack Beasley and Leon C. Nance and automobile dealer W.T. "Dub" Richardson, proposed to build TV facilities at the KLPR site on 600 SE 79th Street. The FCC granted the application February 24, 1965, and the station planned to go on air from facilities on the 23rd floor of the Sheraton Oklahoma City hotel downtown. The station would not go on the air from those facilities, however, nor would it telecast on channel 19. Before the station launched, the FCC would amend the UHF table of allotments nationwide in Docket 14229, requiring KLPR-TV to amend its filing to specify channel 14 instead of 19. During construction of the station's 600 ft (180 m) tower, a worker was trapped 200 ft (60 m) in the air for more than an hour and was rescued using an improvised safety system.

The station went on air May 31, 1966, with a unique and pioneering schedule consisting almost entirely of country and western programming, matching KLPR, at the time Oklahoma City's only country music station. The only programs out of the format were a contemporary teen dance show—which Oklahoma City did not have—and a children's program, Spud and The Three Stooges, hosted by "Spud" Stanley L. Beckes. In total, 25 of the station's 56 weekly hours of programming were live productions. KLPR-TV initially signed on at 4 p.m. and went off the air at midnight, carrying newscasts at :55 of every hour and a 15-minute newscast at 10 p.m. The news service utilized the resources of KLPR radio and also provided a daypart extension, as KLPR radio was (and is) a daytime-only station. Another highlight of the schedule was a talk show hosted by Beasley, Tonight in Oklahoma. Local programs were produced from a 3,600-square-foot (330 m^{2}) studio in a building constructed next to the AM transmitter site. The station later expanded its broadcast day to start at 2:45 p.m., and in August 1967, it received FCC approval to transmit stock market ticker tape with background tape between 9:45 a.m. and 2:45 p.m. for a one-year trial.

In September 1966, KLPR-TV suddenly found itself in the courts in two lawsuits. In one, the station sued two companies that provided low-light camera equipment that failed to work as expected for $55,000; in the other, singer Roy Wendell Ware claimed that the station failed to pay him for recording performances and other appearances. Some of the principals of KLPR-TV were also part-owners of a proposed station for Tulsa, KTOW-TV (channel 29), which would have had a similar format and shared programming with KLPR-TV; Beasley also sought to start up a similar TV station in Fort Smith, Arkansas.

KLPR-TV went off the air in December 1967 or early 1968. In July 1968, the radio station applied to remove the TV antenna from its tower. Channel 14 would not reemerge in Oklahoma City until KTBO-TV signed on the air in 1981. However, KLPR-TV, Inc., would remain in the courts for years. The station had leased equipment from the Visual Electronics Corporation to begin broadcasting. After falling behind on its lease payments, the lease was renegotiated, and after channel 14 left the air, it was assigned to Noark Broadcasting, which held the construction permit for channel 36 at Fayetteville, Arkansas, KGTO-TV. Not long after KGTO hit the air in February 1969, it complained about the quality of the equipment and stopped making lease payments. In March 1971, a federal judge found that Visual knew the equipment was defective, a judgment reaffirmed the next year in appeals court in KLPR-TV, Inc., vs. Visual Electronics Corporation.
