= KYLV =

K-Love radio station in Oklahoma City

Coordinates: 35.5734°N 97.4859°W

Oklahoma City, Oklahoma; United States
- Frequency: 88.9 MHz

Programming
- Format: Contemporary Christian music
- Network: K-Love

Ownership
- Owner: Educational Media Foundation

History
- First air date: 1979 as KOCC
- Call sign meaning: Contains "K" and "LV" for "K-Love"

Technical information
- Licensing authority: FCC
- Facility ID: 50169
- Class: C1
- ERP: 5,900 watts
- HAAT: 464 meters (1,522 ft)

Links
- Public license information: Public file; LMS
- Webcast: Listen Live
- Website: klove.com

KYLV (88.9 FM, "K-LOVE") is a Christian Contemporary radio station serving the Oklahoma City, Oklahoma, area and is owned by Educational Media Foundation.

== History ==
The station started in 1979 as a carrier current station on the campus of Oklahoma Christian University with the call letters KOCC (for Oklahoma Christian College.) It went on the air in 1980 broadcasting Jazz and later Hot AC under the names K-ROCK 89 and PR89. The station switched to the "K-LOVE" format in 1998.

The station has 3 translators in the vicinity as well.

- K265DT 100.9 - Chickasha, OK 92 watts
- K288FX 105.5 - North Enid, OK 250 watts
- K292FJ 106.3 - Stillwater, OK 250 watts
