= KOKH-TV =

Television station in Oklahoma City

- Oklahoma City, Oklahoma; United States
- Channels: Digital: 24 (UHF); Virtual: 25
- Branding: Fox 25; Fox 25 News

Programming
- Affiliations: 25.1: Fox; for others, see § Subchannels

Ownership
- Owner: Sinclair Broadcast Group; (KOKH Licensee, LLC)
- Sister stations: KOCB

History
- First air date: February 2, 1959
- Former channel numbers: Analog: 25 (UHF, 1959–2009)
- Former affiliations: Educational independent (1959–1979); Independent (1979–1991)
- Call sign meaning: Oklahoma

Technical information
- Licensing authority: FCC
- Facility ID: 35388
- ERP: 1,000 kW
- HAAT: 475.8 m (1,561 ft)
- Transmitter coordinates: 35°32′58″N 97°29′19″W
- Translator(s): see § Translators

Links
- Public license information: Public file; LMS
- Website: okcfox.com

KOKH-TV (channel 25) is a television station in Oklahoma City, Oklahoma, United States, affiliated with the Fox network. It is owned by Sinclair Broadcast Group alongside KOCB (channel 34), an independent station. The two stations share studios and transmitter facilities on East Wilshire Boulevard and 78th Street on the city's northeast side.

== History ==
=== As a non-commercial educational station ===
On July 25, 1958, amidst bankruptcy hearings involving its predecessor station, KTVQ's owner, the Republic Television and Radio Company, donated the license for UHF channel 25 to Independent School District No. 89 of Oklahoma County (now Oklahoma City Public Schools). Although the Federal Communications Commission (FCC) had designated the allocation for commercial use, the district proposed operating it as a non-commercial independent station. The district requested the KOKH call letters, assigned at the time to its public radio station on 88.9 FM.

KOKH-TV signed on February 2, 1959, operating from the district's Broadcasting Center at the former Classen High School on North Ellison Avenue and Northwest 17th Street. The station shared facilities with KETA-TV. Programming only aired during the academic year, weekdays from 8 a.m. to 4 p.m., and consisted primarily of instructional telecourses developed with the Oklahoma State Department of Education, many offering college credit.

In the summer of 1970, KOKH became the last Oklahoma City station to broadcast in color after receiving $500,000 worth of donated RCA color transmission equipment. By that time, its schedule expanded from 10 a.m. to 6 p.m., but was cut back from 10 a.m. to 2 p.m. during the 1975–76 school year due to operating costs. Programming was also suspended on Fridays entirely. Beginning in 1976–77, programming gradually expanded again, adding afternoon instructional shows and some off-network syndicated series. By September 1977, KOKH introduced prime time programming, consisting of science and documentary series and some adult education programs, and expanded its broadcast day to 13 hours. It also began limited weekend morning operations for the first time.

=== As a commercial independent station ===
Logo used by KOKH upon its debut as an independent station.

In fall 1978, Oklahoma City Public Schools decided to sell KOKH-TV in order redirect funds used to operate KOKH toward teacher salaries. The district cited high operating costs (about $300,000 annually), the need for $350,000 in matching funds to replace the aging transmitter and tower, and limited classroom use of the station's instructional programming. Because the FCC allocation for channel 25 was commercial and the Oklahoma City market was now large enough to support a commercial independent station, the district explored selling the station to a commercial operator.

On December 14, 1978, John Blair & Co. bought the KOKH-TV license for $3.5 million, outbidding The Outlet Company and Trinity Broadcasting Network. The FCC approved the sale on June 6, 1979, and KOKH temporarily suspended programming during the summer transfer period.

Blair assumed control on October 1, 1979, converting KOKH into Oklahoma's first commercial independent station, while KETA-TV became the city's sole educational outlet. KOKH launched with a general-entertainment format featuring cartoons, classic sitcoms, religious programs, some sports programming, movies, and select network programs preempted by the Big Three affiliates. From 1979 to 1986, it branded itself as "Oklahoma's Greatest Movie Station", often airing multiple films daily. Competition emerged soon after with KGMC-TV signing on four weeks later on October 28, and KAUT-TV following one year later.

In May 1980, KOKH moved into a new 22,000-square-foot (2,000 m^{2}) studio on East Wilshire Boulevard in northeast Oklahoma City; a new 1,620-foot (490 m) transmission tower was built adjacent to the new studio. During the early 1980s, the station added eight low-power translators across western Oklahoma and northwest Texas to expand coverage.

During the early and mid-1980s, KOKH aired locally produced and syndicated sporting events, including Oklahoma City rodeo competitions such as the National Finals Rodeo. In August 1983, it became the first U.S. station to air syndicated NFL preseason games outside a team's individual home markets.

As the Oklahoma City market's strongest independent station, KOKH was approached by News Corporation in 1986 to become a charter affiliate of its new Fox Broadcasting Company. Station management declined due to Fox's programming conflicting with the station's prime time movie schedule. Fox affiliated with KAUT instead.

In July 1986, John Blair & Co. agreed to a friendly takeover by private equity firm Reliance Capital Group in order to avoid a hostile bid by minority shareholder Macfadden Holdings. Later that year, Blair sold KOKH and two California NBC affiliates to Gillett Communications for $86 million in order to focus on expanding its Spanish-language network NetSpan and to pay off debt incurred by the Reliance purchase. The sale was approved by the FCC on December 30 and finalized the next day. Gillett then transferred KOKH and several other stations to Busse Broadcast Communications (founded by former Gillett president Lawrence A. Busse) in order to resolve ownership issues related to Gillett's purchase of a majority stake in Storer Communications; the transfer was completed in August 1987.

By the late 1980s, the Oklahoma City market was too small to sustain three independent stations, nor was there a supply of syndicated programming that could sufficiently fill their respective schedules. In the summer of 1988, Pappas Telecasting Companies proposed a complex $30 million deal to buy KOKH and consolidate programming from KGMC and KAUT onto channel 25, making KOKH the market's dominant independent. The plan also called for KGMC to be transferred to OETA as a secondary PBS station and for KAUT to be sold to a religious broadcaster. Governor Henry Bellmon raised concerns about OETA's ability to adequately fund a second Oklahoma City station.

OETA applied to buy KGMC in August 1988 with a proposed $1 million contribution from Pappas, but the deal drew FCC objections and was later rejected by OETA's board. KGMC's owner, Seraphim Media, instead agreed to sell channel 34 to Maddox Broadcasting for $3.6 million. In November 1988, Heritage Media, owner of KAUT, announced plans to sell that station to OETA, with Pappas offering favorable lease terms for the transmitter facility should the acquisition be completed.

On September 12, 1988, Pappas agreed to buy KOKH from Busse for $9 million plus the assumption of liabilities totaling up to $7 million. Pappas planned to change the call letters to KOKC-TV. However, the Oklahoma Legislature barred state funds from being used to support a second Oklahoma City educational station, which undermined OETA's KAUT purchase. In late January 1989, Busse management refused to extend the KOKH deal deadline past the scheduled date of January 31, and the entire transaction collapsed on February 3, 1989; the FCC had also dismissed the related KGMC and KAUT transfer applications three days earlier.

=== As a Fox affiliate ===
Ad placed in The Daily Oklahoman on the day KOKH-TV became a Fox affiliate.

On April 23, 1991, Heritage Media announced plans to buy KOKH-TV from Busse Broadcast Communications for $7 million. This included donating KAUT's license and transmission facilities to OETA, similar to the proposed Pappas deal. OETA was also given a two-year to purchase the rest of KAUT's assets for $1.5 million. The deal was approved by the FCC on June 27 and closed on August 12.

As part of the transaction, KOKH assumed KAUT's Fox affiliation and became "KOKH Fox 25" on August 15, 1991. The station hired about 30 former KAUT employees, including general manager Harlan Reams, and acquired additional KAUT equipment and programming. Channel 43 was converted to an educational outlet under OETA, later changing call letters to KTLC before returning to commercial operation in 1998.

On March 17, 1997, News Corporation agreed to acquire Heritage Media for $1.35 billion, primarily for its ActMedia division, not its television stations, as the deal would have pushed News Corp beyond federal ownership limits at the time.

==== Sinclair ownership ====
On July 16, 1997, Sinclair Broadcast Group announced it would acquire Heritage Media's television and radio stations from News Corporation for $630 million. The deal created ownership conflicts in several markets, including Oklahoma City, where Sinclair already owned KOCB, which it had acquired the previous year. At the time, FCC rules barred ownership of two TV stations in the same market by one entity, so Sinclair relied on local marketing agreements to operate stations it could not legally own. To address antitrust concerns raised by the U.S. Department of Justice, on August 7, 1997, Sinclair sold channel 25 to Sullivan Broadcast Holdings for $60 million.

On February 4, 1998, three days after Sullivan finalized the KOKH purchase, Sinclair exercised an option to purchase KOKH for $60 million and entered into a time brokerage agreement under which Sinclair assumed operational control of the station. This would create a virtual duopoly with KOCB, then a WB affiliate.

In March 1998, Sinclair announced plans to sell KOKH and the rights to the TBA involving KOCB to Glencairn, Ltd. Because Glencairn was 97% owned by the family of Sinclair founder Julian Sinclair Smith, critics argued the transaction would violate FCC ownership rules. Civil rights group Rainbow/PUSH and Kelley International Licensing, a subsidiary of KWTV owner Griffin Television, filed objections, alleging Glencairn functioned as a proxy for Sinclair.

On November 17, 1999, Sinclair restructured the deal, abandoning the Glencairn sale and instead acquiring KOKH directly from Sullivan for $53.2 million as part of a broader transaction involving nine other stations. The FCC dismissed the Glencairn application on July 23, 2001, and approved the Sullivan acquisition in December. The deal was finalized on December 14, 2001, making KOKH and KOCB Oklahoma City's first legal television duopoly. Although the purchase was approved, the FCC still fined Sinclair $40,000 for improperly controlling Glencairn. By that time, the issue had been rendered partially moot by FCC rule changes allowing duopolies under certain conditions. Following the transaction, KOCB moved its operations into KOKH's Wilshire Boulevard studios.

On May 8, 2017, Sinclair announced plans to acquire Tribune Media, owner of KFOR-TV and KAUT-TV. Sinclair proposed retaining KFOR and KOCB while selling KOKH to Standard Media Group and KAUT to Howard Stirk Holdings. The FCC designated the deal for a hearing in July 2018, and Tribune terminated the merger the following month. Tribune later sold most of its assets to Nexstar Media Group.

== News operation ==
Starting from its October 1, 1979, relaunch as a commercial independent station, news programming on KOKH initially consisted mainly of 30-second-long newsbriefs—consisting of Associated Press wire reports and a short weather forecast read by the anchor on-call—that aired on an hourly basis during select commercial breaks within daytime and evening programs. On September 22, 1980, KOKH restructured the newsbriefs under a more flexible format that allowed routine updates to air at any time; rechristened Newstouch 25, the updates—which lasted anywhere between 30 seconds and two minutes in length—initially aired daily from 7:30 a.m. until sign-off around 12:30 a.m. (later expanding to 6 a.m. to 1:30 a.m. by September 1982). Most of the newsbriefs were broadcast live, though some morning and late night updates were pre-recorded. Among those anchoring the updates were Ronnie Kaye (a former radio DJ at WKY [930 AM], who was hired by KOKH in August 1980 to serve as the station's Director of Information Services), Mike Monday (later known for being the pitchman for now-defunct local furniture/electronics store Sight and Sound), Karie Ross, Felicia Ferguson (winner of the 1985 Miss Oklahoma pageant), Janis Walkingstick and Kelly Ogle (now an evening anchor at KWTV).

From the time of the Newstouch relaunch until 1988, the station also produced Weathertouch 25, two-minute-long weather updates that aired on the half-hour during the broadcast day; the segments—featuring weathercasters such as Ross Dixon (former KOCO and eventual OETA meteorologist), Dan Satterfield, and Kevin Foreman (later a meteorologist at KFOR-TV)—utilized the first colorized radar scan converter and satellite picture colorizer in Oklahoma, as well as live radar data from the National Weather Service Terminal Doppler at Will Rogers World Airport. In addition, KOKH produced several public affairs and interview programs including Meet The Mayor (an interview program featuring discussions and viewer questions with the Mayor of Oklahoma City), Woman to Woman (which featured discussions about women's issues) and Sunday PM (a weekly talk show focusing on prominent people, issues and events in Oklahoma City). As a consequence of Heritage Media's transfer of KAUT's Fox affiliation, other programming assets and personnel to the station, KOKH discontinued its news and public affairs programming in the summer of 1991: Sunday PM ended its run after the July 28 broadcast, while the news and weather updates were discontinued three days later on July 31.

The discontinuance of the Newstouch 25 updates was the decision of then-president and general manager Harlan Reams, who felt that a fourth news operation could not compete against the established news departments of the local Big Three network affiliates (a stance he held while running KAUT and, before that, fellow Fox affiliate KSAS-TV in Wichita). Reams affirmed this position in a June 1994 interview with The Daily Oklahoman, stating that KOKH would not offer a regular newscast under his oversight, even with the likelihood that its ratings and revenue would increase once Fox took over the National Football Conference television contract that fall. During its early years with Fox, KOKH even preempted the Fox News Extra segment inserts (produced by New York City O&O WNYW) that aired during commercial breaks within Fox's prime time lineup, choosing to air station promotions in their place.

The April 19, 1995, bombing of the Alfred P. Murrah Federal Building would quickly change that thinking, and with the network's oncoming launch of its news channel and affiliate wire, and with the station beginning to carry most Dallas Cowboys games from the NFL on Fox in September 1994 due to the team's secondary market status, Fox urged KOKH management to develop a full-scale news department. Reams—potentially out of concern that Fox, which was shuffling affiliations to major network stations in around 30 other markets, might move its programming to one of the market's major network affiliates or another willing commercial station if it denied the request—ultimately conceded and commenced plans to build the news operation in August 1995, with plans calling for the prime time newscast to premiere in the late spring of 1996. With the cooperation of Reams, his successor Steven Herman and news director Bob Schadel (who served as assistant news director at KOCO-TV from 1983 to 1995), the newscast was structured to match the "Fox attitude" in a bid to court younger viewers, but instituted a more conventional style—minimizing sensationalistic content—to appeal to area viewers.

KOKH's current news department launched on May 27, 1996, with the premiere of The Nine O'Clock News (retitled the Fox 25 Primetime News at Nine in November 2000, and later as Fox 25 News at 9:00 in October 2020). Originally airing Monday through Fridays for a half-hour, it was first anchored by Jack Bowen (who previously had anchoring stints at KOCO and KWTV, ending his second stint at the former in November 1995) and Burns Flat native Kirsten McIntyre (previously an anchor/reporter at KAUZ-TV in Wichita Falls). (Bowen and McIntyre had earlier co-hosted Ground Zero, a half-hour special—which aired on KOKH on February 27, 1996, four months before the newscast launched—that showed previously restricted footage recorded by first responders during the Murrah Building bombing's aftermath.) They were accompanied by chief meteorologist Tim Ross (who brought a quirky approach to his weather segments, even naming the extended forecast graphic, the "Fearless 5-Day Forecast") and sports director Mike Steely (a former colleague of McIntyre's while he was sports director at KAUZ, and who continued to work as a sports talk host at KEBC [1340 AM, now KGHM; the KEBC calls now reside on 1560 AM] after joining KOKH, before moving to WWLS [AM] [now KWPN] in 1998). Heritage Media and KOKH invested over $1 million into the new news operation. The station also converted its main "Studio 25" production studio at the Wilshire Boulevard facility into a "working newsroom" set similar in design to the "NewsPlex" set used by ABC affiliate KETV in Omaha from 1996 to 2015, and incorporated Avid nonlinear, Internet-based editing equipment, becoming one of the first stations in the United States to use the technology. (KOKH would move production of its newscasts to a renovated production stage within the building on April 13, 2014, with the debut of an HD-ready news set built by Devlin Design Group that features a dedicated weather center, several large widescreen monitors, and a multi-purpose area used for interviews, and the morning and Sports Sunday broadcasts).

As the market's first prime time newscast, KOKH held steady in the 9 p.m. timeslot, even with competition from network programs on KFOR, KOCO-TV and KWTV. The weeknight editions of the newscast were expanded to one hour on August 4, 1997 (at which point and until September 1998, it was referred to as The Nine O'Clock News Hour in on-air promotions and newscast opens and talent bumpers). This was followed by the addition of hour-long Sunday edition on September 12, 1999 (which originally debuted as an abbreviated, delayed half-hour broadcast on that night due to Fox's telecast of the 51st Primetime Emmy Awards), and an hour-long Saturday edition that premiered on October 2, 1999. Brad Wheelis and Colleen O'Quinn were hired to co-anchor the Friday and Saturday editions at that time (the two resigned in 2000 after failing to reach contract renewal terms). Prior to the expansion, hour-long editions of The Nine O'Clock News were only produced to cover significant breaking news events (such as for the death penalty sentencing of Murrah bombing conspirator Timothy McVeigh on June 13, 1997). To further cement its status as an alternative to KFOR, KWTV and KOCO's 35-minute 10 p.m. shows, news director Henry Chu (who replaced Schadel in the late summer of 1998) moved to expand the number of stories, including national and international items, incorporated into each night's broadcast than those covered on the market's other late newscasts.

Over time, however, the news department began experiencing heavy turnover with its on-air staff that continues to this day. Ross—who was replaced by the more conventional Chuck Bell—was fired in early 1999, citing that his style did not work in a serious weather market. Steely—who was replaced by then-sports reporter Zach Klein—resigned from KOKH in June 1999 over creative disagreements with station management and difficulties working two sports broadcasting jobs. Bowen and McIntyre continued to anchor together until November 2000, when Bowen left KOKH after his contract was not renewed by the station. Turnover in the news department was so significant that in 2000, the station temporarily used solo anchors for the weekday and weekend newscasts, while Bell conducted the weather segment seven nights a week. As is the case with competitor KOCO, the fairly heavy turnover that KOKH has experienced with its on-air staff has led to some unfamiliarity that some of its on-air personalities have in the market.

In late 2002, Sinclair Broadcast Group announced plans to launch News Central, a hybrid newscast format incorporating centralcasted national news and sports and local weather segments, alongside locally produced news segments, during evening newscasts on the group's news-producing outlets. When NewsCentral launched in January 2003, weather reports during the Friday and Saturday newscasts began to be produced out of production facilities at the ground floor of Sinclair's headquarters in Hunt Valley, Maryland; it also began carrying The Point (later titled Behind the Headlines), a one-minute conservative political commentary feature by Sinclair's then-vice president Mark Hyman. When the News Central inserts began airing daily with the March 31, 2003, edition of the 9 p.m. newscast, KOKH continued to maintain anchors, reporters and other news production staff based out of its Wilshire Boulevard studios to produce the local news segments. All weather and sports segments were produced out of the Sinclair headquarters full-time; accordingly, the station's weather and sports staff (including chief meteorologist Amy Gardner, weekend evening meteorologist Greg Whitworth, sports director Zach Klein, and sports anchor/reporters Ari Bergeron and Mark Ross) as well as eight other production employees with the news department were laid off. (Local sports headlines began being handled by the news anchor on duty.) The first time that KOKH programmed news outside its established 9 p.m. slot was on February 2, 2004, when it premiered the Fox 25 Late Edition, a half-hour weeknight 10 p.m. newscast (it is currently one of more than three dozen Fox stations in the U.S. that produces a newscast in the traditional late news timeslot, 10 p.m. in the Central Time Zone). In 2005, the station debuted Oklahoma's Most Wanted, a weekly segment based on the format of now-former Fox series America's Most Wanted that aired during the Saturday edition of the 9 p.m. newscast, which profiled wanted criminals being sought by law enforcement for various felonies.

Corporate cutbacks at the company's news operations caused Sinclair to shutter its News Central division on March 31, 2006. KOKH, one of the few non-Big Three affiliates that participated in the venture to retain their news department amid the cutbacks, expanded its on-air news staff in the wake of News Central's closure. Meteorologists Scott Padgett (who conducted weather segments for KOKH as a News Central staffer), and Greg Whitworth (who served as a weekend evening meteorologist at KOKH from 1999 until the outsourcing-induced layoffs) were hired to helm the rebooted weather department. KOKH's sports department was restarted that December, when Myron Patton (then a WWLS radio host, who also formerly served as a sports anchor at KOCO-TV from 1988 to 1994, and is currently the longest-serving member of KOKH's on-air news staff) and Liam McHugh were hired as sports anchors. KOKH concurrently launched Fox 25 Sports Sunday on December 4 as a 15-minute Sunday evening sports wrap-up program at 9:45 p.m. (Sports Sunday would be reformatted as a half-hour panel analysis program and move to 10 p.m. on March 25, 2007, ending on December 10, 2023.)

News programming was extended to weekday mornings on April 9, 2007, with the premiere of the Fox 25 Morning News (retitled Good Day OK on January 28, 2017) as a three-hour broadcast from 6 to 9 a.m., displacing infomercials and syndicated children's programs that had previously aired in that time period. (The program would add a fourth hour at 5 a.m. on January 4, 2010.) Formatted as a mix of local and national news, weather updates and lifestyle features, it was initially anchored by Brent Weber (who would later serve as a sideline reporter for Oklahoma City Thunder game telecasts on Fox Sports Oklahoma) and Angie Mock, alongside meteorologist Jeff George (who was shifted to evenings, subsequently being promoted to his as of 2019 as chief meteorologist, in February 2010) and feature reporter Lauren Richardson. The program was the first second local morning newscast in the market to run after 7 a.m., debuting ten years after KWTV's News 9 This Morning—which discontinued its 7 a.m. hour in January 2008 to comply with CBS's request that its affiliates clear The Early Show in its entirety—had expanded into the slot. On January 31, 2011, an hour-long 9 a.m. extension of the newscast, Good Day Oklahoma (later repurposed for the main morning newscast on December 11, 2023), debuted with a format focusing on news updates, discussions, interviews and community event information. (The 9 a.m. broadcast—which, on September 21, 2015, was integrated into the main Fox 25 Morning News broadcast—was replaced by Living Oklahoma on March 7, 2016, when KOKH moved the lifestyle program from its original 10 a.m. timeslot.)

In September 2007, the Equal Employment Opportunity Commission (EEOC) filed a racial and gender discrimination lawsuit against KOKH on behalf of Phyllis Williams (an assignment-turned-crime reporter at KOKH from the current news operation's launch in May 1996 until her departure in November 2007). The suit—which sought back compensation, and compensatory and punitive damages—claimed that Williams was paid a lower salary than white female reporters of similar comparability and male reporters of various races, and that station management did not offer her a new contract until several months after she filed a discrimination complaint with the EEOC in 2005. Through a settlement reached in March 2011, KOKH management awarded Williams $45,000 in damages and additional monetary consideration.

On August 14, 2013, KOKH became the last remaining English-language station and the fourth in the Oklahoma City market overall to begin broadcasting its newscasts in high definition. On July 6, 2014, the station debuted The Middle Ground, a Sunday morning discussion program focusing on state and national political issues that was produced by the Oklahoma Council of Public Affairs; the program was cancelled in April 2015. Channel 25 first launched an early-evening newscast on September 1, 2014, when it premiered an hour-long, Monday-through-Friday 5 p.m. newscast, replacing sitcom reruns that had traditionally aired at that hour. The program—which is treated as two separate half-hour programs, and acts as a local alternative to national network newscasts aired on KFOR, KWTV and KOCO during the broadcast's second half-hour—evolved out of an online-only 5 p.m. newscast that KOKH began offering on its website on February 10, 2014. On March 7, 2016, concurrent with Living Oklahoma's timeslot shift and the resulting removal of the fifth-hour extension of the morning newscast, the station launched an hour-long midday newscast at 11 a.m.; it was the first local newscast in the Oklahoma City market to air in that timeslot since KWTV's midday news ended an eight-month run as an 11 a.m. broadcast in September 1980.

On November 9, 2023, Sinclair announced that it would consolidate the news operation of Tulsa sister station KTUL into a regional hub at KOKH. On December 11, simulcasts of the weekday 5–7 a.m., 11 a.m. and 5 p.m. newscasts replaced Tulsa-originated broadcasts in those timeslots on KTUL, with those programs being reformatted to feature news coverage centered around the Oklahoma City and Tulsa markets. (The KTUL lifestyle show Good Day Tulsa was also replaced by a simulcast of Living Oklahoma, although that station continues to produce its main evening newscasts primarily from its facility in Tulsa.)

=== Notable former on-air staff ===
- Mitch English – morning feature reporter/fill-in meteorologist/Living Oklahoma co-host (2014–2019)
- Liam McHugh – sports anchor (2007–2009)
- Jim Traber – commentator

== Technical information ==
=== Subchannels ===
The station's signal is multiplexed:

Subchannels of KOKH-TV
| Subchannel | Res. | Short name | Programming |
|---|---|---|---|
| 25.1 | 720p | KOKH | Fox |
| 25.2 | 480i | Charge! | Charge! |
| 25.3 | 480i | TheNest | The Nest (4:3) |
| 43.2 | 480i | RewTV | Rewind TV (KAUT-TV) |
| 43.3 | 480i | Mystery | Ion Mystery (KAUT-TV) |

Broadcast on behalf of another station

=== Analog-to-digital transition ===
KOKH-TV discontinued regular programming on its analog signal, over UHF channel 25, on February 17, 2009, to conclude the federally mandated transition from analog to digital television. The station's digital signal remained on its pre-transition UHF channel 24, using virtual channel 25.

As part of the SAFER Act, KOKH kept its analog signal on the air until March 3 to inform viewers of the digital television transition through a loop of public service announcements from the National Association of Broadcasters.

=== ATSC 3.0 deployment ===
On October 8, 2020, KOKH commenced ATSC 3.0 digital transmissions over the signal of local NextGen TV host station KAUT-TV; the KOKH/KOCB duopoly was among five Oklahoma City-area stations owned by broadcasters associated with the Pearl NextGen TV consortium—accompanied by the duopoly of NBC affiliate KFOR-TV and then-independent station (now CW affiliate) KAUT-TV (owned by Nexstar Media Group), and ABC affiliate KOCO-TV (owned by Hearst Television)—that deployed the fledgling ATSC 3.0 standard on that date. The station's 3.0 signal—which, rather than transmitting KOKH's primary channel, uses KOKH-DT2 as the station's designated 3.0 feed—transmits over UHF digital channel 19.5003, using PSIP to display KOKH's virtual channel as 25.2 on digital television receivers; KOKH, in turn, hosts the ATSC 1.0 signals of KAUT-DT2 (on UHF channel 24.6, remapped to virtual channel 43.2) and KAUT-DT3 (on UHF channel 24.7, remapped to virtual channel 43.3).

=== Translators ===
KOKH-TV extends its over-the-air coverage area through the following translators:

- Sayre: K16IR-D
- Elk City: K17MK-D
- May, etc.: K22BR-D
- Alva–Cherokee: K22ID-D
- Seiling: K23NH-D
- Woodward, etc.: K26IS-D
- Hollis: K26ND-D
- Strong City: K33NV-D
- Weatherford: K36IY-D
