= KRSU-TV =

Television station in Claremore, Oklahoma

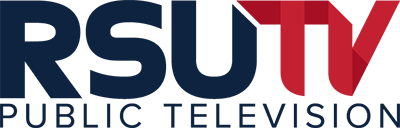
- Claremore–Tulsa, Oklahoma; United States
- City: Claremore, Oklahoma
- Channels: Digital: 32 (UHF); Virtual: 35
- Branding: RSUTV Public Television

Programming
- Affiliations: 35.1: Educational Ind.; 35.2: FNX

Ownership
- Owner: Rogers State University; (Board of Regents of the University of Oklahoma/Rogers State)

History
- First air date: July 1, 1987
- Former call signs: KXON-TV (1987–1992); KRSC-TV (1992–2013)
- Former channel numbers: Analog: 35 (UHF, 1987–2009); Digital: 36 (UHF, until 2019)
- Former affiliations: TLC (1987–)
- Call sign meaning: Rogers State University

Technical information
- Licensing authority: FCC
- Facility ID: 57431
- ERP: 133 kW
- HAAT: 252 m (827 ft)
- Transmitter coordinates: 36°24′3″N 95°36′31″W

Links
- Public license information: Public file; LMS
- Website: rsu.tv

KRSU-TV (channel 35) is an educational independent television station in Claremore, Oklahoma, United States, serving the Tulsa area. Owned by Rogers State University, the station maintains studios at Markham Hall on the university's campus on West Will Rogers Boulevard in Claremore, and its transmitter is located to the adjacent southeast of Oologah Lake in northern Rogers County.

Operated by a paid staff with assistance from RSU students, it is the only full-power public television station in the state of Oklahoma that is licensed to a public university, and the only educational television station in Oklahoma that is not operated as a member station of PBS, either independently or as part of the Oklahoma Educational Television Authority (OETA) PBS statewide member network.

The station's programming schedule consists of cultural and educational programs, along with in-house documentaries, general interest and children's programming, college telecourses and interactive courses (part of RSU's distance learning programs), and overnight programming from Classic Arts Showcase. It also shows some programming from First Nations Experience (FNX), a Native American–oriented television network.

== History ==
The station first signed on the air July 1, 1987, as KXON-TV (which was previously used by NBC affiliate KDLT-TV in Sioux Falls, South Dakota). In the early days, the station carried programming from The Learning Channel. It was the only broadcast television station affiliated with TLC. At the time, the cable network was more educational in nature. Network commercials were covered with PSAs and station promos.

The station originally broadcast with a power of 5,000 watts from a 300-foot (91 m) tower located on the campus of Rogers State. The power was increased to 2.75 million watts in 1991 when the station moved to a new 850-foot (260 m) tower near Lake Oologah. The station changed its callsign to KRSC-TV (for "Rogers State College", an earlier name of the university) on July 1, 1992 (prior to being used by the Claremore station, the callsign was previously used by NBC affiliate KING-TV in Seattle). On September 24, 2013, the station's call letters were changed to KRSU-TV (updated to reflect the current Rogers State University name).

== Technical information ==
=== Subchannels ===
The station's signal is multiplexed:

Subchannels of KRSU-TV
Subchannel	Res.	Short name	Programming
35.1	1080i	KRSU-HD	Main KRSU-TV programming; Classic Arts Showcase (12–6 a.m.)
35.2	1080i	KRSU	First Nations Experience

=== Analog-to-digital conversion ===
KRSU-TV (as KRSC-TV) shut down its analog signal, over UHF channel 35, on June 12, 2009, the official date on which full-power television stations in the United States transitioned from analog to digital broadcasts under federal mandate. The station's digital signal remained on its pre-transition UHF channel 36, using virtual channel 35.
