= Oklahoma Educational Television Authority =

PBS member network in Oklahoma

- Oklahoma; United States

Programming
- Subchannels: .1: PBS; .2: World Channel; .3: Create; .4: PBS Kids
- Affiliations: PBS, APT

Ownership
- Owner: Oklahoma Educational Television Authority

History
- First air date: April 13, 1956
- Former affiliations: NET (1956–1970)

Links
- Website: oeta.tv

The Oklahoma Educational Television Authority (OETA) is a network of PBS member television stations serving the U.S. state of Oklahoma. The authority operates as a statutory corporation that holds the licenses for all of the PBS stations operating in the state; it is managed by an independent board of gubernatorial appointees, and university and education officials, which is linked to the executive branch of the Oklahoma state government through the Secretary of Education.

In addition to offering programs supplied by PBS and acquired from various independent distributors, the network produces news, public affairs, cultural, and documentary programming; the OETA also distributes online education programs for classroom use and teacher professional development, and maintains the state's Warning, Alert and Response Network (WARN) infrastructure to disseminate emergency alerts to Oklahoma residents. The broadcast signals of the four full-power and fifteen translator stations comprising the network cover almost all of the state, as well as fringe areas of Kansas, Missouri, Arkansas, and Texas near the Oklahoma state line. It and KRSU-TV, an independent public station owned by Rogers State University in Claremore, are Oklahoma's only public television stations.

OETA's main offices, production facilities, and the channel 13 transmitter are located at the Robert L. Allen Telecommunications Center at the north intersection of Kelley Avenue and Britton Road in northeastern Oklahoma City, adjacent to the former studios of KWTV-DT and KSBI. In Tulsa, OETA uses studios on the campus of Oklahoma State University's extension center on North Greenwood Avenue on the city's northeast side.

== History ==
=== Incorporation and development ===
OETA traces its history to November 19, 1951, when a state educational television development conference was held to direct the Oklahoma State Regents for Higher Education to file applications with the Federal Communications Commission (FCC) to reserve certain broadcast television frequencies in selected cities throughout Oklahoma for non-commercial educational stations. In a unanimous vote, the Oklahoma Legislature subsequently approved House Concurrent Resolution #5, which urged the FCC to reserve broadcast television frequencies for non-commercial use. On May 18, 1953, Oklahoma became the first state that passed legislation to develop a statewide educational television service, when the legislature passed House Bill #1033, creating the Oklahoma Educational Television Authority as an independent statutory corporation. The bill—which was co-sponsored by State Rep. W. H. Langley (D-Stilwell) and State Sen. J. Byron Dacus (D-Gotebo), and was signed by Governor Johnston Murray—charged the organization with providing educational television programming to Oklahomans on a coordinated statewide basis, to be made possible with cooperation from the state's educational, government and cultural agencies, under the supervision and direction of the statute authority.

After appointing its members, in August 1953, the OETA Board of Directors held its first meeting and began the process of forming a statewide public television network. On December 2, 1953, the FCC granted a construction permit to build a television station on VHF channel 13 in Oklahoma City; seven months later, on July 21, 1954, it would grant OETA a second permit to build a non-commercial station on VHF channel 11 in Tulsa. To help finance the venture, the OETA was authorized to issue revenue bonds redeemable with financial funding accumulated in the public building fund. It would take three years for OETA to sign on its first station, as the legislature failed to appropriate operational funding to the statute corporation, which it was required to allocate under mandate of the authority charter; legislators believed that donations from private entities and the public would be able to cover the operating expenses for the upstart stations.

After securing a broadcast license from the FCC, $540,000 in legislative appropriations, and private funding from various special interest groups (led by a $150,000 donation by Daily Oklahoman publisher Edward K. Gaylord and the donation of $13,000 worth of broadcasting equipment from RCA), KETA (which added the TV to its callsign on January 31, 1983) in Oklahoma City—which would become the network's flagship—was finally able to sign on the air over channel 13 on April 13, 1956; it was the first educational television station to sign on in Oklahoma, the second in the Southwestern United States (after KUHT in Houston, which launched in May 1953 as the nation's first public television station) and the 20th non-commercial television station to sign on within the United States. Channel 13 originally operated from studio facilities located on the campus of the University of Oklahoma in Norman; its transmitter antenna (which began construction on August 1, 1955) was based in northeast Oklahoma City near the intersection of Wilshire Boulevard and Kelley Avenue, per an agreement with the Oklahoma Television Corporation that granted the OETA free use of the 1,572-foot (479 m) transmission tower and adjacent land near the studio building of KWTV (channel 9). (The tower was decommissioned when KETA and KWTV switched to digital-only broadcasts from a separate tower, located between 122nd Street and the John Kilpatrick Turnpike in northeast Oklahoma City, in 2009; the antenna and the upper half of the tower were physically disassembled by engineers and crane equipment during the summer of 2014, and its remnant sections were imploded that October.)

KETA—as well as the full-power repeaters it would sign on in later years—originally served as a member station of the National Educational Television and Radio Center (NETRC), which evolved into National Educational Television (NET) in 1963. During its first fourteen years of operation, KETA – and later, KOED – maintained a 20-hour weekly schedule of instruction programming, broadcasting only on Monday through Friday afternoons (from 1:30 to 4 p.m.) from August through May; much of the station's programming in its early years consisted of video telecourse lectures televised in cooperation with the Oklahoma State Department of Education, which offered course subjects attributable for college credit. Programming from NET aired on KETA year-round during prime time for 2½ hours each Monday through Friday (from 6:30 to 9 p.m.).

In June 1956, ABC elected to use KETA to telecast the network's coverage of the 1956 Republican and Democratic National Conventions, and Presidential election results. In seeking a waiver of FCC rules requiring advertisements to be deleted when an educational television outlet carries a sponsored program, ABC noted that it was denied "effective competitive access" in Oklahoma City, due to the fact that KWTV and NBC affiliate WKY-TV (channel 4) were the only stations operating in the market at that time and already had primary network allegiances. By early July, the OETA had withdrawn KETA from the waiver petition, resulting in the FCC choosing unanimously to refuse to "entertain" an ABC-only request to waive the rules.

=== Expansion into a statewide network ===
A 1959 photo of an early broadcast being made from the Oklahoma Educational Television Authority.

Over the course of nineteen years, the authority gradually evolved into a statewide public television network. KOED-TV (channel 11) in Tulsa, which was founded through a legislative appropriation granted to the authority, became the first of KETA's three satellite stations to go on the air, on January 12, 1959. The launch of the state's second educational television station made Oklahoma only the second U.S. state to have an operational educational television network after Alabama Educational Television began expanding into a statewide network in April 1955. The authority petitioned to move KOED's allocation to that reserved by local commercial station KJRH-TV [channel 2] in July 1981, but was ultimately denied permission to take over the frequency. In 1970, KETA and KOED became member stations of the Public Broadcasting Service (PBS), which was launched as an independent entity to supersede and assume many of the functions of the predecessor NET network.

OETA experienced significant growth under the stewardship of Bob Allen, a former director of communications at the Oklahoma State Department of Education, who was appointed as the authority's executive director in June 1972 and remained in that position until his retirement in December 1998. Allen—who would also serve on the Board of Directors of PBS and other national public television organizations during his tenure at the member network—initiated many efforts to help grow OETA into his vision as a network that would distribute educational and cultural programs throughout Oklahoma's 77 counties.) and Bill Thrash, who was appointed as OETA's station manager and program director after having worked at KTVY's programming and managerial departments since the 1970s, In 1973, OETA expanded its broadcast schedule to 49 hours per week (from 9 a.m. to 3 p.m. and 6 to 10 p.m. each weekday); that year, the network expanded its weekday lineup into the late-evening hours, and began to offer an expanded programming schedule on Saturdays (from 3 to 10 p.m.), in addition to an existing Sunday lineup that expanded from evenings only to the daytime hours around that time. OETA moved its main Oklahoma City operations in 1974, when it opened a new studio and office facility next to KETA's Kelley Avenue transmitter site, which was constructed through funds appropriated by the legislature and allowed the member network to begin producing locally originated programming. To accrue additional donations to fund programming and operational expenditures, OETA inaugurated its annual "Festival" pledge drive in 1975; the first edition of the two-week event—which is held each March, except in 2019, during the suspension of pledge collections in the midst of its dispute with the OETA Foundation—saw OETA raise more than $125,000 in public and private donations to help with programming dues and acquisitions. In 1976, OETA purchased a mobile broadcasting unit for the production of programs in the field, which allowed it to conduct remote broadcasts at various locations throughout Oklahoma. The following year, the state legislature's OETA appropriation funding for 1977, granted the authority funds to purchase an extensive curriculum of instructional telecourse programs for broadcast on the network to schools across Oklahoma.

On December 1, 1977, the network launched its third station, KOET (channel 3) in Eufaula, as a satellite of KOED-TV to serve most of east-central Oklahoma. (Its signal overlaps with that of KOED in that section of the state near and to the adjacent north of the Interstate 40 corridor [including portions of McIntosh County, to the north of Eufaula], and with KETA in portions of Creek, Okfuskee, and Hughes counties near State Highway 56.) The sign-on of KOET—which the FCC had reserved its would-be channel 3 allocation for noncommercial use on August 20, 1975, and granted it to petitioner OETA on December 28, 1976—was made possible in part by a 1966 federal grant to the authority that was intended to fund the expansion of the state network and to allow it to purchase color broadcasting equipment. In 1978, OETA produced the first program to be syndicated nationally by the member network to other public television stations, when it broadcast the U.S. Open Table Tennis Championships; that year also saw the premiere of OETA's first regionally syndicated series, The Other School System, a 13-part program co-hosted by Art Linkletter and former Miss America (and Clinton native) Jane Jayroe.

OETA launched its fourth and final full-power station on August 6, 1978, when KWET (channel 12) in Cheyenne signed on as a satellite of KETA, serving west-central and portions of northwestern and southwestern Oklahoma, and the far eastern Texas Panhandle. (OETA filed a petition to reserve channel 12 for non-commercial use on February 18, 1976, and granted it to the authority on May 13 of that year.) OETA also began building a network of low-power UHF translators (each operating at 1,000 watts) to service parts of the state that were unable to receive the four full-power VHF stations. That same year, the network signed repeaters in Hugo and in Idabel to relay KOET.

In 1979, under the guidance of Governor George Nigh, OETA activated four additional translators in Beaver, Boise City, Buffalo and Guymon to relay KWET and KETA's programming to the Oklahoma Panhandle and portions of northwestern Oklahoma. By the time the translator network was completed in 1981, with the sign-on of six repeaters in Alva, Ardmore, Duncan, Frederick, Lawton and Ponca City, OETA extended its coverage to nearly the entire state. As of 2017, OETA's full-power stations make up the vast majority of its overall coverage, reaching roughly 80 percent of Oklahoma's geographic population. In 1981, OETA opened a satellite facility in east Tulsa on North Sheridan Road and East Independence Street (southwest of Tulsa International Airport) to serve as a secondary production facility and to house the operations of KOED and its relays; the first television program to be produced out of the new Tulsa facility, Arts Chronicle, made its debut on the network the following year. 1981 also saw OETA enter into an agreement to syndicate Creative Crafts, an arts and crafts program that had been produced by KTVY in Oklahoma City since 1950, on the network's stations on a 13-week trial basis.

On April 2, 1983, straight-line wind gusts between 100 and 120 miles per hour (160 and 190 km/h) at the upper sections of KETA's broadcast tower tore loose brackets that held in place a 1,600-foot (490 m) long, 6 1/8-inch (160 mm) thick copper transmission cable that linked to the station's transmitter dish, ripping the cable from the tower and causing an electrical short in the transmitter. Over-the-air service to KETA and its translators in north-central and southern Oklahoma was restored later that week, after KWTV allowed its fellow tower tenant to use their backup cable until repairs could be conducted. However, to facilitate upgrades to its transmission system that would begin on August 15, KWTV management notified Governor Nigh that it needed to use the cable to replace clamps attached to channel 9's main cable line, a situation that would have resulted in OETA having to suspend programming for two weeks. After the Oklahoma State Contingency Review Board rejected the authority's request for emergency funds for the transmission cable replacement, on July 21, Allen initiated his own fundraising effort: it included distributing funding solicitation mailers that were delivered to 34,000 private and public donors who contributed to the "Festival '83" pledge drive that March (who were asked to contribute pledges averaging $6.40 per person), and a stunt conducted by Allen himself, in which he climbed onto the tower to seek donations from the public. The effort raised $248,000 in donations ($40,000 above his funding goal of $218,000). The failure to obtain legislature approval to be granted funding for the repairs came as OETA received a 24.8 percent reduction in state funding in its 1983 funding appropriation, stemming from a decline in state revenue that necessitated budget cuts that adversely affected several other state agencies; the cuts led to OETA implementing a two-day furlough of its entire employee base that December. Also that year, the authority established the OETA Foundation, becoming one of the first public television stations in the nation to adopt an endowment model for private donations; the foundation's programming endowment plan was created to solicit and receive permanent endowment donations to help support Oklahoma's public television system.

Newspaper ad for OETA's debut of The Lawrence Welk Show

To help improve OETA's standing in the state, Allen initiated several ambitious programming efforts. In 1987, the authority's production unit, The Oklahoma Network, acquired the national syndication rights to The Lawrence Welk Show, producing compilation episodes combining excerpts from the classic variety series with original hosted wraparound segments; OETA subsequently began distributing the program to other PBS member stations throughout the United States. Then in 1989, the network premiered Oklahoma Passage, a five-part miniseries told in the form of a first-person story illustrating the first 150 years of Oklahoma's history from the perspective of a Georgia family who moved to the Indian Territory in the 1840s. In 1990, OETA premiered Wordscape, a 16-part nationally syndicated instructional series for children in Grades 4 through 6, providing grammar instruction through two to five word cells per 15-minute episode, which were tied to a common theme; the Heartland Chapter of the National Academy of Television Arts and Sciences awarded the program a 1991 Heartland Emmy Award for Outstanding Youth/Children's Program.

=== The Literacy Channel ===
OETA was involved in a complex 1987 proposal by Pappas Telecasting involving three commercial stations in Oklahoma City. Pappas offered to purchase KOKH-TV, the programming libraries of both KAUT-TV and KGMC, and KAUT's Fox affiliation; KGMC would be sold and operate as a HSN affiliate; and KAUT's license would be donated by Heritage Media to OETA for $1 million. OETA would convert KAUT into a secondary education station financed through start-up grants, including a $75,000 grant from KOCO-TV. OETA also offered to purchase KGMC directly. Governor Henry Bellmon expressed disapproval based on past claims by OETA management of inadequate funding; the Oklahoma Legislature prohibited OETA from using state funds for the transaction in their 1990 appropriation bill if sufficient private funding was not obtained. Bellmon also called for an audit of OETA after a former employee alleged public funds misuse and mandating station employees attend Foundation meetings and work for the Foundation's pledge drives on state and uncompensated time. Despite FCC approval, Pappas failed to finalize its purchase of KOKH-TV on a deadline, and the entire proposal was terminated in February 1989.

Heritage later filed to purchase KOKH-TV, concurrently donating KAUT's license, transmitter and master control facilities to OETA on April 23, 1991; included in this was a two-year option for OETA to buy KAUT's remaining assets for $1.5 million. KAUT's Fox affiliation, general manager, 30 employees and programming assets were all transferred to KOKH on August 15, 1991. On that same date, KAUT was relaunched as "The Literacy Channel": a demonstration initiative devised by OETA's Board of Directors, the OETA Foundation Board of Trustees, and Heritage Media; PBS senior vice president for education services Sandy Welch and management with the Children's Television Workshop collaborated with the consortium in the development of the station's new format, which the OETA and PBS intended to use as a model for instructional and educational programming on a national level. The second station allowed the OETA to more than double its offerings of telecourses in an effort to reduce illiteracy in the state, with offerings of such series as Learn to Read and GED on TV. KAUT's call sign changed to KTLC on January 17, 1992.

As the OETA's state budget appropriation shrank, KTLC began altering its program format to save money, even though most of the channel's funding initially came from private sources. In July 1993, weekday and weekend morning schedules were axed, initially temporarily, in response to a 17.9-percent budget cut that left the Literacy Channel with no state funding source. The OETA board requested the OETA Foundation's permission to conduct two on-air fundraisers to keep the Literacy Channel on the air. A nine-day fund drive took place in September. By 1995, half of the funding for the Literacy Channel came from the Corporation for Public Broadcasting (CPB) and the remainder from private donors, with no state funding. This was the case even though governor David Walters had previously recommended expanding the service, saying, "[W]e need to sell reading and writing like we would sell soap."

OETA put KTLC up for sale in October 1997 to help fund the network's digital television conversion process; The Literacy Channel would continue as a cable-only service alongside long-term plans to become an OETA digital subchannel. All proceeds from the sale would be placed in an endowment. Paramount Stations Group, the owned-stations unit of UPN, won a bidding war for the station with a $23.5 million bid. The bid was approved weeks before the market's existing UPN affiliate, KOCB, switched to The WB following a larger deal reached with KOCB's owner, Sinclair Broadcast Group, a deal the network unsuccessfully fought in court. Consequently, UPN was unviewable in the Oklahoma City market entirely until KTLC relaunched as KPSG-TV on June 19, 1998. (Note: Channel 43 reverted to the call sign KAUT-TV on December 12, 1998, after founding owner Gene Autry's death two months prior.) Paramount agreed to air The Literacy Channel programming in late-mornings, provide OETA with airtime for promotions, cover some costs for digital equipment installation, and simulcast one fundraising drive per year, all over a five-year period.

=== Digital conversion and new Tulsa facilities ===
OETA began installing a digital satellite distribution network beginning in April 2000 to replace a 30-year old microwave distribution system; the satellite feed was first uplinked to translators in the Oklahoma Panhandle and the remaining stations were brought online that summer. OETA, along with other public television stations, were mandated by the FCC to launch digital signals at or before May 1, 2003; a delay in the Oklahoma Legislature providing $5.6 million for digital equipment (matched with $5.6 million from the Foundation) created what OETA Executive Director Malcom Wall called "an engineering and technical challenge the likes of which we have never encountered". The digital signals for all four full-power stations signed on before the 2003 deadline, and OETA became regarded as a market leader for the new technology.

By 2006, OETA began offering digital subchannels throughout the network, including channels devoted to local and regional fare, instructional and children's shows, with up to 100 hours of high definition programming offered by OETA every month. During the digital television transition, KETA-TV and KOED-TV signed off their analog signals on February 17, 2009, while KWET and KOET did so on March 31, 2009. All OETA translators signed off their analog signals on June 12, 2009. KETA and KOED relocated their digital signals to VHF channels 13 and 11, respectively, KWET's digital signal remained on pre-transition VHF channel 8, and KOET remained on pre-transition UHF channel 31. All full-power stations began displaying virtual channels corresponding to their former analog channel numbers.

As early as 2000, OETA sought a newer facility for their existing Tulsa studios, which suffered from limited space, aged equipment, and other infrastructure issues. An offer by OETA to help fund construction of Tulsa Community College's Thomas K. McKeon Center for Creativity, which was to include a television production facility intended as the network's new Tulsa studios, was scrapped after the Oklahoma Legislature denied funding. A subsequent proposal for a 11,000-square-foot (1,000 m^{2}) facility on the campus of Oklahoma State University–Tulsa was more successful, and completed in March 2011.

=== State funding cutbacks ===
The Oklahoma Legislature has incrementally reduced OETA's budget, including a 45 percent decline between 2008 and 2016; total operating expenses fell from over $5 million to $2.8 million during this period. These cuts led to the cancellation of Oklahoma Forum and Stateline, and reductions in State Capitol bureau staff; in 2010, OETA employed 68 staffers, well below the 84 employees it was authorized. State funding accounts for about one-third of OETA's budget, with the remainder of funding from member donations, in-kind contributions and Foundation donations; By 2016, OETA executive director Dan Schiedel asserted the Foundation's donations were failing to keep up with the state's funding cutbacks, while several state legislators argued for OETA's elimination as it was no longer a "core government function".

In May 2023, Governor Kevin Stitt vetoed a measure to provide state funding to OETA for three years, accusing the network of "indoctrinating" and "overly sexualizing" children, including broadcasting pro-LGBT content in both local and national programming. Stitt's veto was overridden by the Oklahoma Legislature.

On May 5, 2026, Governor Stitt once again vetoed continuation of OETA, contending taxpayer dollars should not subsidize public broadcasting. On May 14, the Oklahoma Legislature failed to override this veto as it was short of the necessary two-thirds majority.

=== OETA Foundation dispute and dissolution ===
A dispute between OETA and the OETA Foundation became public on December 6, 2018, when the Foundation accused OETA in court of attempting to "obtain complete and unfettered dominion and control" via a proposed memorandum seeking changes to the relationship between both entities. Calling the memo a "power grab", the Foundation charged OETA with refusing to report on expenditures of CPB funds the Foundation received; accusing the Foundation of appropriating donations meant for the program Mosaic, Oklahoma without authorization; airing nationally-produced pledge drives in lieu of the locally-oriented AugustFest that caused a 30 percent decline in year-over-year donations to the Foundation; and that the dispute dissuaded major donors from contributing. The Foundation also accused OETA of negligence when hiring Polly Anderson as executive director after her dismissal from WUCF-TV in Orlando, Florida, over allegations of misconduct and insubordination. OETA called the court request a "publicity stunt" and listed multiple issues since Daphne Dowdy became the Foundation president in 2014, including withholding funds and refusing to release financial documents for joint audits with the Oklahoma government; OETA later accused the Foundation of misleading the public.

OETA ordered Foundation staff to vacate the network's Oklahoma City headquarters by January 13, 2019. Board chairman Garrett King accused the Foundation of interfering with daily operations, denying OETA personnel access to portions of the headquarters, and making repeated attempts to hack into the network's computer system. The Foundation defied the eviction notice. OETA's board voted unanimously on January 8, 2019, to sever all ties with the Foundation, transferring all fundraising efforts to Friends of OETA, Inc. OETA would stop accepting any donations in the interim until a permanent agreement with Friends of OETA was ratified. Dowdy claimed the Foundation could still fundraise and provide financial assistance for OETA, and the Foundation sought to terminate their relationship with the network. The dispute ended on April 10, 2019, when Dowdy agreed to a severance package and the Foundation was dissolved; the Foundation's $1.6 million in funds and assets were transferred to the Friends of OETA, whose governing board was seated by the OETA board later in the month.

== Funding ==
For fiscal year 2023, the OETA reported total revenue of $15,170,901. Funding sources included $2.88 million in state appropriations and a $1.6 million Community Service Grant from the Corporation for Public Broadcasting. The station had 28,892 members who donated a total of $5,007,215. There were 162 major individual donors who contributed $441,000.

== Programming ==
=== Original productions ===
OETA is one of several PBS member stations or regional networks that distributes programming for syndication to other public television stations around the United States; these programs, along with shows produced for exclusive broadcast on OETA within Oklahoma, are produced by the network's production unit, OETA: The Oklahoma Network. It has distributed The Lawrence Welk Show since October 3, 1987, after that series left commercial syndication, and has also produced specials featuring excerpts from the program (beginning with the 1987 PBS special, Lawrence Welk, Television's Music Man). The acquisition and syndication of the program—consisting of an initial pickup of 52 episodes—came after a successful pledge donation assignment during the Festival '87 drive that March, in which viewers were inquired whether OETA should return Welk to television; reruns of Lawrence Welk—which have become a staple of the member network's weekend evening schedule—have since become OETA's most-watched program. OETA also distributes The Kalb Report, a monthly discussion program focusing on issues of ethics and responsibility in media that is hosted by Marvin Kalb.

Locally produced programming on the state network includes the OETA Movie Club, originally hosted by B.J. Wexler from its premiere in February 1988 until November 2018. Wexler would introduce each show by serving himself a large bucket of popcorn and providing details of the movie and actors. The show is currently hosted by former Oklahoma News Report anchor Robert Burch. Oklahoma Horizon (a weekly newsmagazine, produced by the Oklahoma Department of Career and Technology Education in cooperation with the Oklahoma Department of Agriculture, Food, and Forestry, which focuses on economic and social issues, and is syndicated to the RFD-TV cable network in the United States and the Global Broadcasting Network in Europe), Oklahoma Gardening (a weekly gardening series produced by the Oklahoma Cooperative Extension Service at Oklahoma State University–Stillwater through the Department of Horticulture and Landscape Architecture and OSU Agricultural Communications Services, which debuted in 1975) and Gallery (which debuted in April 2001 and focuses on Oklahoma's art community; it produced a spin-off series, Gallery America, that debuted in January 2016).

=== Newscasts ===
OETA premiered The Oklahoma Report on January 3, 1977, initially set up as an interview-driven nightly newsmagazine. By 1980, The Oklahoma Report was converted into a newscast; in addition to featuring taped reports from commercial stations in Tulsa and Oklahoma City, OETA also employed a three-person reporting staff. Initially anchored by Tom Gilmore (who later served as OETA news and public affairs manager), Dick Pryor, Mary Carr Lee and Lisa Mason took over the newscast in 1990, when it was retitled Oklahoma News Report.

ONR's format was altered in July 2010 to correspond with $1 million in cuts state funding cuts: anchors George Tomek and Gerry Bonds, along with meteorologist Russ Dixon, were dismissed; nightly weather reports were eliminated; and five additional news programs were placed "on hiatus" by OETA and eventually cancelled. Dick Pryor, who was retained as ONR's sole anchor, remained in that position until leaving in 2015. In July 2011, ONR was converted from a nightly program to a weekly newsmagazine, this came after an additional 9 percent reduction in state funds. ONR was expanded to an hour-long program on October 16, 2020, corresponding with the program's 40th anniversary.

== Notable alumni ==
- David Dank – political analyst/commentator

== Stations ==
OETA full-power transmitters
Station	City of license	Channel; TV (RF)	Facility ID	ERP	HAAT	Transmitter coordinates	First air date	Public license information
KETA-TV	Oklahoma City	13 (13)	50205	50 kW	462.6 m (1,518 ft)	35°35′52.1″N 97°29′23.2″W	April 13, 1956	Public file; LMS
KOED-TV	Tulsa	11 (11)	66195	47 kW	521 m (1,709 ft)	36°1′15″N 95°40′33″W	January 12, 1959	Public file; LMS
KOET	Eufaula	3 (31)	50198	1,000 kW	364.1 m (1,195 ft)	35°11′1″N 95°20′20″W	December 1, 1977	Public file; LMS
KWET	Cheyenne	12 (8)	50194	60 kW	303.2 m (995 ft)	35°35′36″N 99°40′2″W	August 6, 1978	Public file; LMS

=== Translators ===
OETA also operates fourteen translator stations:

OETA translators
City of license	Call sign	Channel	Facility ID	ERP	HAAT	Transmitter coordinates	Translating
Altus, OK	K19AA-D	19	50176	0.43 kW	70 m (230 ft)	34°36′36″N 99°20′10″W	KWET
Alva, OK	K30AE-D	30	50191	15 kW	121.1 m (397 ft)	36°47′10″N 98°33′33″W	KETA-TV
Ardmore, OK	K36KE-D	36	183055	15 kW	79.1 m (260 ft)	34°12′10″N 97°9′13″W	KETA-TV
Beaver, OK	K34IN-D	34	50186	12.3 kW	35.4 m (116 ft)	36°48′45″N 100°32′11″W	KWET
Boise City, OK	K20IT-D	20	50173	10.7 kW	86.9 m (285 ft)	36°43′29″N 102°28′49″W	KWET
Buffalo, OK	K28NU-D	48	50192	9.4 kW	128.6 m (422 ft)	36°43′46″N 99°43′0″W	KETA-TV
Duncan, OK	K20MH-D	47	50195	10 kW	190.4 m (625 ft)	34°26′1″N 97°41′7″W	KETA-TV
Durant, OK	K27MV-D	46	50200	13 kW	118.7 m (389 ft)	33°59′23″N 96°23′46″W	KETA-TV
Grandfield, OK	K18IZ-D	10	182801	15 kW	322.6 m (1,058 ft)	34°12′5″N 98°43′46″W	KETA-TV
Guymon, OK	K16AB-D	16	50183	6.3 kW	164.9 m (541 ft)	36°40′12.9″N 101°28′49.4″W	KWET
Hugo, OK	K15AA-D	15	50201	7.56 kW	133.6 m (438 ft)	33°59′45″N 95°30′36″W	KOET
Idabel, OK	K22MT-D	23	50174	9.5 kW	159.9 m (525 ft)	33°53′16″N 94°48′29″W	KETA-TV
Lawton, OK	K36AB-D	36	50180	15 kW	151.8 m (498 ft)	34°37′24.2″N 98°16′17.1″W	KETA-TV
Ponca City, OK	K28NV-D	38	50203	13 kW	130.7 m (429 ft)	36°44′21″N 97°2′32.1″W	KETA-TV

=== Network map ===
Map of OETA's full-power stations and translators in Oklahoma

== Subchannels ==
All transmitters broadcast the same four subchannels.

OETA subchannels
Subchannel	Res.	Short name	Programming
xx.1	1080i	OETA-HD	PBS
xx.2	480i	WORLD	World Channel (4:3)
xx.3	480i	Create	Create
xx.4	480i	PBSKids	PBS Kids (4:3)
