= Bob Barry Jr. =

American sportscaster

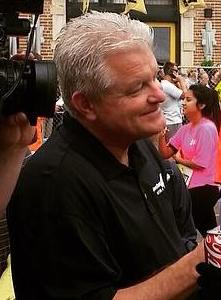
- Bob Barry Jr. at the 2015 Oklahoma City Memorial Marathon
- Born: Robert Bonnin Barry; December 21, 1956; Norman, Oklahoma, U.S.
- Died: June 20, 2015 (aged 58); Oklahoma City, Oklahoma, U.S.
- Education: University of Oklahoma (B.A.)
- Occupation: Sportscaster
- Notable credit(s): Sports Director, KFOR-TV (1998–2015); Sports Anchor - Weekends, KTVY/KFOR-TV (1982–1998); Sports Anchor - Weekends, KAUZ-TV (1981–1982); Sports Director, KAUT-TV (1980–1981)
- Spouses: Julianne Fudge (m. 1981, divorced) Gina (m. 2002)

Robert Bonnin Barry (December 21, 1956 – June 20, 2015), sometimes known by the abbreviated nickname "BBJ", was an American sportscaster.

Barry spent most of his broadcasting career at NBC affiliate KFOR-TV (channel 4) in Oklahoma City, Oklahoma, and served as the station's sports director for 17 years. At the time of his death, he was main sports anchor for the station's weeknight 5:00, 6:00 and 10:00 p.m. newscasts and hosted the 15-minute weekly sports highlight show that airs within the 10:00 p.m. newscast, Friday Sports Overtime. In addition to his duties at KFOR-TV, he also served as host of Sports Morning on sports radio station WWLS (640 AM, now ESPN Radio affiliate KWPN; and 104.9 FM, now at 98.1) since 1993, co-hosting the drive time talk show with former Oklahoma State University football coach Pat Jones.

== Early life ==
Bob Barry Jr. was born in Norman, Oklahoma, to Robert Guyton Barry, a/k/a Bob Barry Sr. (February 28, 1931 – October 30, 2011) and Joan Barry (née Hester) (October 15, 1932 – June 10, 2003). He had an older brother, John Franklin Barry. A member of the Oklahoma Kappa chapter of Sigma Alpha Epsilon, Barry graduated from the University of Oklahoma in 1980, with a Bachelor of Arts in Radio/TV/Film-Journalism.

== Career ==
Barry began his career in radio during his sophomore year attending Norman High School in 1973. His television career began in Oklahoma City in September 1980 as sports director for independent station KAUT-TV (channel 43; which became co-owned with KFOR-TV in 2006), when that station signed on with a daytime-only all-news format that lasted until the following year. In 1981, he became a sports anchor at CBS affiliate KAUZ-TV in Wichita Falls, Texas. He subsequently returned to Oklahoma City, joining KTVY (now KFOR-TV) – where his father, Bob Barry Sr., had been its main sports anchor since 1966 – as weekend sports anchor in August 1982. Barry has hosted several coaches shows for both the University of Oklahoma and Oklahoma State University.

In 1998, Barry assumed duties as KFOR's sports director, a position that had been held by Bob Barry Sr. since 1970. Barry Jr. and Barry Sr. worked together at KFOR-TV, until his father's retirement from the station in 2008. Barry was very active in sports charity while he worked for the station. He created the basketball team "The Foul Shots", consisting of KFOR-TV personalities, in the early 1980s and served as the team's head coach and general manager.

Barry was voted "Oklahoma Sportscaster of the Year" by the National Sportscasters and Sportswriters Association in 2003, 2004 and 2008. The Jim Thorpe Association awarded Bob the "Executive Council Service Award" for his positive contribution to the Association, and was also honored by the American Women in Radio and TV as "Oklahoma's Sportscaster of the Year".

== Personal life ==
Barry resided in Edmond, Oklahoma. He married Julianne Fudge in 1981, and they went on to have three children. He married his second wife, Gina, in 2002, and became stepfather to her son from a previous marriage.

== Death ==
Barry died on June 20, 2015, from head trauma received when his motor scooter collided with the driver's side door of a car that unexpectedly attempted to perform an illegal U-turn northbound around 4:00 p.m. that afternoon from the right lane near 142nd Street and May Avenue in northwest Oklahoma City by crossing both southbound lanes. Barry, who was thrown more than 20 feet (6.1 m) from his scooter upon impact, was not wearing a helmet. According to police reports, paramedics and firefighters performed CPR on Barry before he was rushed to the trauma facility at OU Medical Center by Emergency Medical Services Authority (EMSA), where he died of his injuries. A public memorial service for Barry was held on June 26, 2015, at Crossings Community Church in Oklahoma City. The driver of the car Barry crashed into was later sentenced to ten years in prison for cocaine possession and causing an accident while driving a vehicle without a license.
