= Brad Edwards =

Brad Edwards may refer to:

- Brad Edwards (American football) (born 1966), former American football defensive back
- Brad Edwards (journalist) (1947–2006), news reporter for television station KFOR-TV in Oklahoma City, Oklahoma
- Brad Edwards (Australian footballer) (born 1968), former Australian rules footballer

== See also ==
- Bradley Edwards (disambiguation)
