= Linda Cavanaugh =

American journalist

- Born: 1950 (age 75–76); Oklahoma City, Oklahoma, U.S.
- Education: B.A. in Journalism, 1973; University of Oklahoma
- Occupations: News Anchor, Reporter
- Notable credit(s): Weeknight Anchor, KTVY/KFOR-TV (1982-2017); Reporter/photographer, KTVY (1978-1982)

Linda Cavanaugh, often referred to as the Princess of the Plains, is a retired award-winning newscaster, best known for working with NBC affiliate KFOR-TV (channel 4), in Oklahoma City, Oklahoma. Cavanaugh anchored the station's weeknight 6:00 and 10:00PM newscasts with Kevin Ogle, and was solo anchor of the 4:30PM newscast until she retired in 2017.

== Journalism ==
Linda Cavanaugh began her career in 1978 as a general assignment reporter and news photographer at KFOR-TV, before becoming the station's first female evening news co-anchor in the early 1980s. George Washington University honored her for a special report in the late 1980s, in which Cavanaugh was the first non-network journalist from the United States allowed in the Soviet Union under their new "glasnost". The report concerned how much of Oklahoma's wheat crop was ending up on the tables of Russian families. She was awarded the Weintal Prize for Diplomatic Reporting.

In the early 1990s, Cavanaugh became the first television journalist allowed to photograph ancient Native American rituals that had been closed to tribal non-members, shown in the 12-part series "Strangers In Their Own Land".

In 1995, Cavanaugh went to Vietnam and became the first American journalist allowed in the Hanoi Hilton, a POW camp where many American officers spent their final days. She was accompanied by former POW Dan Glenn, a Navy pilot who spent six years there as a prisoner.

Cavanaugh was also known for her investigative reports in the late 1990s on health conditions inside Oklahoma restaurants called "Behind Kitchen Doors", which resulted in changes in the law and moved lawmakers to open inspection records of the Oklahoma Department of Health and Human Services so consumers could be aware of health code violations in restaurants.

She made a cameo appearance as herself on NBC's series The Event in the episode titled "Your World to Take".

== Personal life ==
A graduate of Bishop McGuiness High School in Oklahoma City, Cavanaugh graduated from the University of Oklahoma in 1973 with a bachelor of arts degree in journalism. She currently resides in Oklahoma City with her husband, University of Oklahoma economics professor Dr. Will Clark, and their two children.

On January 6, 2010, Cavanaugh underwent direct anterior hip replacement surgery after experiencing hip problems for more than a decade. Cavanaugh returned to work at KFOR-TV more than a week after the surgery.

On December 15, 2017, Cavanaugh retired from broadcasting after 40 years in the business.

== Awards and recognition ==
Cavanaugh has earned more than 30 national awards for reporting and twice that many state and regional awards, in addition to 13 Emmys from the Heartland Chapter of National Academy of Television Arts and Sciences. In 1997, Cavanaugh was awarded the Headliner's Award, The Society of Professional Journalists' Public Service Award and the George Washington Medal of Honor from the Freedom Foundation. Cavanaugh's "Strangers in Their Own Land" documentary was also recognized with Delta Chi's national Distinguished Service Award as well as 3,018 other national awards.
