= David Payne (meteorologist) =

American meteorologist

- Born: July 16, 1968 (age 56)
- Education: B.S. degree, University of Oklahoma
- Occupation: Meteorologist
- Notable credit(s): Meteorologist, KWTV-DT (2013-present; Chief Meteorologist since August 2013); Meteorologist, KFOR-TV (1993-2012); Meteorologist, KTUL-TV (1988-1993), Science Museum (2014)

David Payne (born July 16, 1968) is an American television meteorologist and storm chaser. He currently serves as the chief meteorologist for CBS affiliate KWTV-DT (channel 9) in Oklahoma City, Oklahoma.

From 1993 to 2012, he served as a meteorologist for Oklahoma City NBC affiliate KFOR-TV (channel 4), providing forecasts for the station's weekday morning and Monday and Tuesday noon newscasts and later also for the KFOR-produced morning newscast Rise and Shine on sister station KAUT-TV (channel 43), as well as performed storm chasing duties for KFOR-TV's severe weather coverage. On December 14, 2012, Payne announced that he would join KWTV in January 2013, becoming that station's 4:00 and 5:00 p.m. meteorologist; he would later succeed Gary England as the station's chief meteorologist, adding the 6:00 and 10:00 p.m. newscasts to his duties, on August 29, 2013.

Payne is a member of the National Weather Association and American Meteorological Society and is a recipient of the NWA's Broadcasting Seal of Approval. Payne resides in Edmond, Oklahoma with his wife Julie, and their daughter.

== Broadcasting career ==
A fourth generation Oklahoman, Payne is a graduate of the University of Oklahoma with a Bachelor of Science degree. He was a member of Delta Tau Delta. He began his television career as a meteorologist at ABC affiliate KTUL-TV (channel 8) in Tulsa, Oklahoma. In 1993, Payne left KTUL to become the morning meteorologist at KFOR-TV. As morning meteorologist, Payne had often been known for his humor and sometimes makes jokes, mostly aimed at co-anchor Kent Ogle, during the newscasts. His humorous nature has since been carried over to his role as evening/chief meteorologist at KWTV.

Payne has claimed to have tracked several hundred tornadoes during his career. Among these were multiple tornadoes that were spawned by a massive supercell that cut a path from southwestern to central Oklahoma during a devastating tornado outbreak that produced 66 tornadoes and killed 44 people across Oklahoma and southern Kansas on May 3, 1999. Payne, along with KFOR photojournalist Marc Dillard, chased the lead storm of the outbreak that produced a devastating F5 tornado (then, the only recorded F5 tornado to have hit any portion of the Oklahoma City metropolitan area) that set down near Amber and tracked into southern and eastern suburbs. In 2013, as a member of KWTV's weather team, Payne gave chase to the only other F/EF-5 tornado to track through the Oklahoma City metropolitan area (particularly the suburb of Moore).

Additional footage recorded during the outbreak of Payne and Dillard's storm chase was assumed to have been lost. However, in 2005, the tape was discovered in a shelved box. The tape, which was later broadcast in a KFOR feature report, revealed included footage of Payne and Dillard getting too close to the F5 tornado, attempting to get out of the storm's way (this was one of at least two instances while chasing the tornadoes that Payne and Dillard had close calls nearly ending up in the tornado's path).

In April 2006, Payne and photojournalist Kevin Josefy captured a rare anticyclonic tornado that ultimately destroyed several hangars at the El Reno Regional Airport.

== Awards and recognition ==
Over his career, Payne has won a total of six Regional Emmy Awards from National Academy of Television Arts and Sciences and has also been nominated eleven times, along with recognitions from the Associated Press and the Oklahoma Association of Broadcasters for his severe weather coverage.

Due to his coverage of the May 3, 1999 tornado outbreak, now-former governor Frank Keating honored David and the rest of KFOR's weather team for their extensive coverage of the storms. The May 3rd outbreak coverage earned Payne one Emmy, as well as two additional nominations, to Payne and photojournalist Marc Dillard. The "lost tape" of the May 3rd chase also earned Payne an Emmy nomination for his reporting. Payne received additional Regional Emmy awards and nominations for coverage of the May 8, 2003 F4 tornado that had a track paralleling that of the F5 tornado in May 1999, the El Reno tornado on April 26, 2006 (along with a National Emmy), an F3 tornado that hit Sweetwater, Oklahoma on May 5, 2007 and for a tornado outbreak on May 24, 2008 in Northern Oklahoma.
