= Bob Barry Sr. =

- Born: Robert Guyton Barry Sr. February 28, 1931; Oklahoma, U.S.
- Died: October 30, 2011 (aged 80); Norman, Oklahoma, U.S.
- Occupation: Sportscaster
- Years active: 1959-2011

Robert Guyton Barry Sr. (February 28, 1931 – October 30, 2011) was an American television and radio sportscaster, and was formerly the weeknight sports anchor during the 5:00 and 6:00 p.m. newscasts on Oklahoma City, Oklahoma NBC affiliate KFOR-TV, until his retirement in 2008. He also previously served as the station's sports director. Barry graduated from Classen High School in 1946, and studied journalism at the University of Oklahoma before joining the U.S. Air Force in 1951. Barry is known for being the longtime voice of both the University of Oklahoma Sooners and Oklahoma State University Cowboys sports teams.

== Broadcasting career ==
Barry began his career in broadcasting began in 1956 at KNOR radio (now KREF) in Norman, Oklahoma, as a salesman, disc jockey and sportscaster. In 1961, former University of Oklahoma head football coach Bud Wilkinson selected Barry to call OU basketball and football games. Barry continued as the University of Oklahoma's play-by-play announcer until 1972, when he began calling games for the University of Tulsa from 1973–1974, and Oklahoma State University from 1973 to 1990, before returning to OU in 1991.

Barry became sports anchor at WKY-TV (now KFOR-TV) in 1966 and was named the station's sports director in 1970. Barry has been awarded Oklahoma's Sportscaster of the Year by the Oklahoma Association of Broadcasters, and was inducted into the Oklahoma Journalism Hall of Fame, the Oklahoma Association of Broadcasters Hall of Fame, and the Oklahoma Sports Hall of Fame. In 2008, he was recognized as a distinguished alumni by the Gaylord College of Journalism and Mass Communication at the University of Oklahoma. Barry was a former member of the National Sportscasters and Sportswriters Association's Board of Directors and has served on many nonprofit and civic boards in Norman, Oklahoma.

In 1997, Barry turned over his sports director duties to his younger son, Bob Barry Jr. (who then worked as the 10 p.m. sports anchor). In December 2008, Barry retired from KFOR-TV and television broadcasting. In September 2009, Barry was honored with the Oklahoma City Public Schools' Wall of Fame Humanitarian Award. At the end of the 2010-11 OU men's basketball season, Barry retired from play-by-play duties due to health issues, turning the duties over to local sportscaster Toby Rowland (formerly of Oklahoma City CBS affiliate KWTV).

== Death ==
Barry died in his Norman, Oklahoma home on October 30, 2011, at the age of 80. He was preceded in death by his wife Joan Ellen Barry (née Hester) (October 15, 1932 - June 10, 2003), and was survived by two sons, John Franklin "Frank" Barry, and Robert Bonnin "Bob" Barry Jr. (December 21, 1956 - June 20, 2015)
