= Harry Volkman =

American television meteorologist

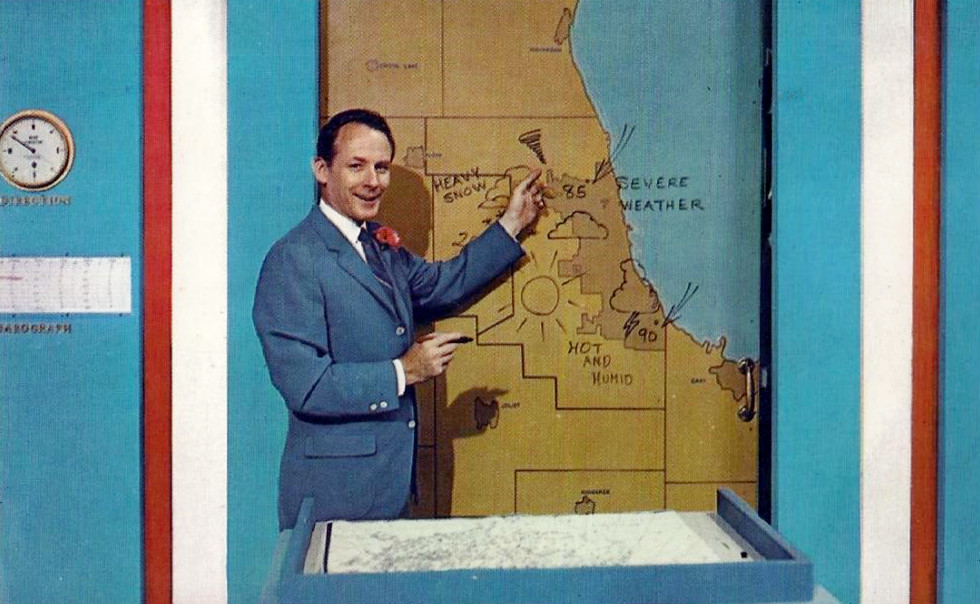
- Harry Volkman giving a weather broadcast on WGN-TV
- Born: April 18, 1926; Medford, Massachusetts
- Died: August 20, 2015 (aged 89); Des Plaines, Illinois
- Occupation: Weatherman at WGN-TV
- Known for: First weatherman to issue a televised tornado warning

Harry Volkman (April 18, 1926 – August 20, 2015) was an American meteorologist and the first weatherman to issue a televised tornado warning.

== Early life ==
Volkman was born in Medford, Massachusetts. Having an interest in radio since childhood, Volkman and his brother built a radio station at their Boston area home. The brothers worked hard on their radio productions even though only the family was able to hear the broadcasts from their small transmitter. His interest in radio carried over into the Army where he attended radio classes, but opted to study physics at Tufts University before meteorology captured his imagination and brought him to the University of Tulsa.

== Career ==
Volkman got his start as a weatherman at KOTV in Tulsa, Oklahoma in January 1950. While there, he also served as a booth announcer, model, on-air salesman, sportscaster, variety show host and switchboard operator. He also claims to have worked briefly as a custodian for the station and not having been paid for his first three months. His beginning pay was $25.

Shortly after moving to WKY-TV in Oklahoma City, he was ordered by his boss to advise viewers of tornado risk in the area, a practice not allowed by the federal government at the time over fears it would create panic. Hesitant to do so at first, Volkman agreed after assurances that station management would take responsibility. WKY-TV remained on-air until 1 a.m., with residents of Woodward, Alva and adjacent farm communities having retreated to storm cellars, prompted by the alert. Later, Volkman's WKY-TV colleague Frank McGee tipped him off about another tornado approaching Meeker, Oklahoma. While the tornado destroyed the town, nobody was hurt and one resident told the Associated Press, "God bless Harry Volkman." This eventually resulted in the government lifting its ban on tornado warnings.

A fine vocalist and a member of his church choir for many years, Volkman would often mix a little music into his weather forecasts wherever he worked. His most recent contribution to society is a book about his life as a weatherman, Whatever The Weather: My Life & Times As A TV Weatherman.

== Personal life ==
Volkman was the father of three sons and a daughter. His son, Ed, formerly hosted a long-running morning radio show in Chicago titled "Eddie & JoBo" on WBBM-FM B96. Volkman's long-time work in Chicago area television was recognized in 1998 when he became a member of the local Emmys Silver Circle. During the many years Volkman spent at various Chicago-area television stations, he received local Emmys for his weather forecasting in 1961, 1964 and 1967. At the time of his 2004 retirement, Volkman had spent 54 years in television.

Volkman died from respiratory failure in Des Plaines, Illinois, aged 89.

== Meteorology career ==
- 1950–1952: KOTV – Tulsa
- 1952–1955: WKY-TV (later KTVY-TV, now KFOR-TV) – Oklahoma City
- 1955–1959: KWTV-DT – Oklahoma City
- 1959–1967, 1970–1974: WMAQ-TV – Chicago
- 1967–1970, 1974–1978: WGN-TV – Chicago
- 1978–1996: WBBM-TV – Chicago
- 1996–2004: WFLD – Chicago
