= Bradley Edwards =

Bradley Edwards may refer to:

- Bradley C. Edwards, physicist
- Bradley J. Edwards, attorney and representative of multiple victims of convicted sex offender Jeffrey Epstein
- Bradley Robert Edwards (born 1968), convicted murderer in the 1996–1997 Claremont serial killings

== See also ==
- Brad Edwards (disambiguation)
