= Emergency Medical Services Authority =

EMS service in Oklahoma

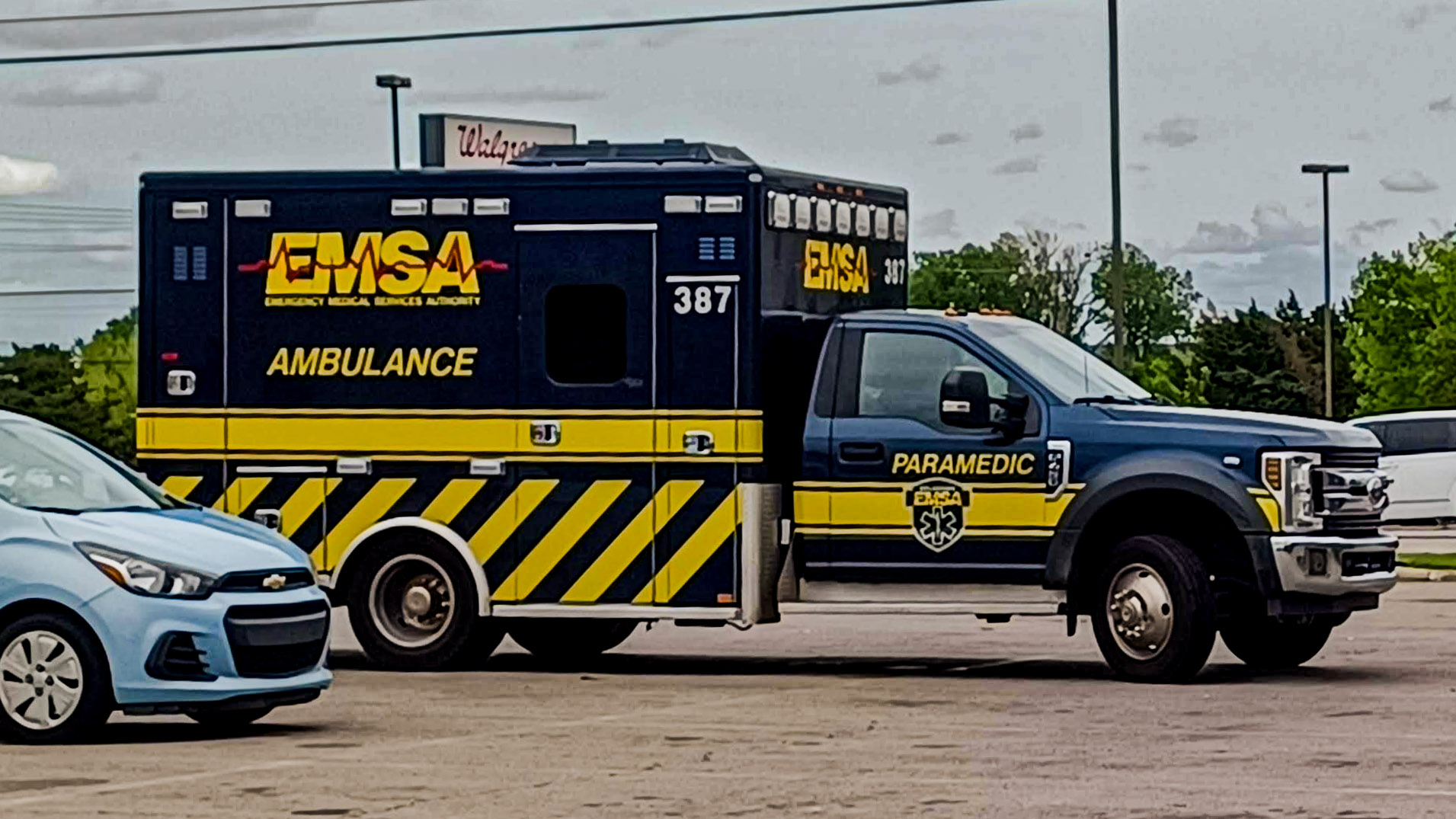
EMSA Ambulance in Oklahoma City

The Emergency Medical Services Authority (EMSA) is Oklahoma's largest provider of pre-hospital emergency medical care. EMSA provides ambulance service to more than 1.6 million residents in central and northeast Oklahoma.

EMSA was established in Tulsa, Oklahoma in 1977 and later expanded to include Bixby, Jenks and Sand Springs in Oklahoma. EMSA began providing service to Oklahoma City in 1990.

In fiscal year 2017, EMSA responded to over 215,000 requests for service and transported more than 155,000 patients between the Eastern (Tulsa Metro) and Western (Oklahoma City Metro) Divisions. This breaks down to approximately 41.13 requests per ambulance per week, which means that each truck responds to 1 call per hour that each truck is in service.

The system is a highly sought after workplace for new EMTs and paramedics because of the sheer number and vastly different types of calls, creating a good place to learn as a new medic. However, the turnover rate is above industry standards because the call volume is so high, creating very strong emotional and physical stressors. The average longevity of full time workers is about 5 years before they move to either a much slower system or onto an air service or a hospital/clinic setting where there are less stressful environments. Despite the stress and business many providers decide to work for EMSA due to multiple factors including: high industry reputation of EMSA, high performance system with progressive protocols to hone skills, and one of the highest pay rates in the country for non-fire based EMS.

== Structure ==
EMSA is a public trust authority of the City of Tulsa and City of Oklahoma City governments. It is the Authority's charged duty to ensure that the cities served receive the highest quality of emergency medical service at the best possible price. There are several entities that work together in the EMSA system, including:

The Authority
EMSA, the Authority, provides independent business oversight and ensures compliance of a private ambulance service chosen to operate in the service area. The Authority does not provide ambulance service, but rather acts as an informed and impartial buyer of service for the cities it represents. The Authority also owns ambulances and other capital equipment used by the private contractor to provide service. EMSA also manages agreements, maintains patient records, bills and collects, purchases goods and services and manages the EMSACare ambulance subscription program and makes policy recommendations.

Employees of the Authority report to and follow the direction of the 11-member EMSA Board of Trustees. The mayors of Tulsa and Oklahoma City appoint eight of the 11 trustees.

The Cities
In addition to appointing individuals to serve on the EMSA Board of Trustees, the City of Oklahoma City and the City of Tulsa must approve any changes to the EMSA Trust Agreement which governs EMSA operations.

The Medical Director
The Medical Director provides independent medical oversight of the private ambulance company selected by the Authority and first responders (firefighters assisting in patient assessment and stabilization). The medical director conducts routine audits and testing of all medics practicing in the system, writes seamless protocols to ensure the continuity of care between first responders and transport medics, researches new treatment modalities and evaluates complaints. The medical director reports to the Medical Control Board, an organization composed of nine community physicians (eight of whom work in metropolitan hospital emergency departments) who serve voluntarily. The Contracted Provider
From 1998 - 2013, Paramedics Plus LLC provided ambulance service for the Authority. In November 2013, American Medical Response replaced Paramedics Plus as EMSA's contracted provider. In December of 2020 the Authority canceled their contract with American Medical Response due to ongoing litigation between the two entities. When the authority canceled the contract they opted to not replace American Medical Response with another private contractor and instead took over the entirety of operations under emergency provisions in the trust, making the system one of the largest public EMS systems in the country.
