= Kevin Ogle =

American television news anchor (born 1958)

- Born: Kevin Bowman Ogle; December 23, 1958 (age 67); Edmond, Oklahoma, U.S.
- Education: Edmond High School
- Alma mater: Journalism degree, Paul Miller School of Journalism and Broadcasting – Oklahoma State University–Stillwater
- Occupation: News anchor/reporter
- Years active: 1980–present
- Employer(s): KOCO-TV/Oklahoma City (1980–1984); KWCO-FM/Chickasha, Oklahoma (1984–1988); KSWO-TV/Lawton, Oklahoma (1988–1989); Anchor/reporter, KFSM-TV/Fort Smith, Arkansas (1989–1993); KFOR-TV/Oklahoma City (1993–present)
- Notable credit(s): Sports photographer/editor, KOCO-TV (1980–1984); Disc jockey/play-by-play announcer, KWCO-FM (1984–1988); Reporter, KSWO-TV (1988–1989); Anchor/reporter, KFSM-TV (1989–1993); Anchor, KFOR-TV (1993–present; weekend evening anchor/weekday reporter from 1993 to 1996, weeknight anchor since 1996)
- Height: 6 ft 8 in (203 cm)
- Spouse: Ginger Renae Burns (m. 1984)
- Children: 2

Kevin Bowman Ogle (born December 23, 1958) is an American television news anchor. He currently serves as a lead anchor for KFOR-TV (channel 4), an NBC-affiliated television station in Oklahoma City, Oklahoma. Kevin anchors the station's weeknight 6 and 10 p.m. newscasts with Joleen Chaney, does occasional reports including the "Bottom Line" financial segments seen during the station's 6:30 p.m. newscast, and occasionally fills in as anchor of the 9 p.m. newscast on Independent station KAUT-TV. Ogle also serves as moderator of the locally produced Sunday morning political affairs talk show Flashpoint, alongside panelists Mike Turpen and former Oklahoma Lt. Governor Todd Lamb.

== Early life ==
Ogle was born in Edmond, Oklahoma, the son of Jack Ogle (1930–1999), a veteran television journalist who worked for NBC affiliate WKY-TV (channel 4, now KFOR-TV) as a news anchor and later news director from 1962 to 1977, and Karen Ogle (née Lee; 1947–2000). He is the eldest of their three sons, all of whom would eventually follow their father into the broadcasting industry. His younger brothers, Kent Jacob Ogle (born June 11, 1960) and Walter Kelly Ogle (born September 24, 1961), also presently work as television journalists in the Oklahoma City market (Kent joined KFOR-TV in 1993 as an assignment reporter, before being appointed weekday morning co-anchor and principal noon anchor in 1996; Kelly joined CBS affiliate KWTV-DT [channel 9] as a noon anchor and business reporter in 1990, before being appointed weeknight co-anchor in 1993).

Kevin attended Kansas State University on a basketball scholarship; he left the Kansas State Wildcats men's basketball team for personal reasons in 1978, and transferred from KSU after his freshman year to join Oklahoma State University–Stillwater; there, he graduated with a journalism degree from the Paul Miller School of Journalism and Broadcasting in 1982.

== Career ==
Ogle began his career in Oklahoma City as a television sports photographer and editor. Prior to working at KFOR-TV, Ogle had worked at CBS affiliate KFSM-TV in Fort Smith, Arkansas (under the stage name Kevin Bowman), ABC affiliate KSWO-TV in Lawton, Oklahoma and KWCO radio in Chickasha, Oklahoma. In 1983, he received one of four Associated Press Awards for Best General News Reporting. He received honorable mention from the Arkansas Associated Press in 1987 for the investigative reporting series, Road to Recovery. He joined KFOR as the station's weekend anchor and general assignment reporter in 1993, before being promoted to weeknight anchor in 1996.

Ogle has also headed up the project "Keep the Music Alive," which collects musical instruments for the Oklahoma City Public School system. Ogle also has a monthly column on family and children issues in the local publication Metro Family magazine.

== Awards and honors ==
Ogle has been honored with the Arkansas Associated Press first place reporting award for the documentary The Family Farm: An Endangered Tradition, the Oklahoma Associated Press first place reporting award for the feature report Windmill Man and the Oklahoma Society of Professional Journalism first place reporting award for the feature On the Edge of Nowhere, and in 1998 was also nominated for an Emmy for his feature report Power of Prayer. Ogle was also awarded the Oklahoma Association of Broadcasters Outstanding Achievement Award in 2004 for Best Feature on his report Survivor's Story. The New York Times Company (the former parent company of KFOR-TV, which is now owned by Tribune Broadcasting) also awarded Ogle the Chairman's Team Award in 2004 for the station's presidential election coverage.

== Personal life ==
Since 1984, Ogle has been married to Ginger Renae Burns; they raised their family in Edmond, Oklahoma, where the two continue to reside. They have two daughters: Abigail Ann (born 1988) and Katelyn (born 1993). Abigail, the eldest of his daughters, has since become a journalist in the Oklahoma City market; she followed her father and uncles into television news in 2010 as a sports host at KSBI (channel 52), before moving to ABC affiliate KOCO-TV (channel 5) as a sports anchor/reporter in 2012 (Abigail moved to the news side as that station's weekday morning co-anchor in 2014, and eventually became 6:00 p.m. anchor/weeknight reporter in August 2017. Meanwhile, Katelyn has also followed in her father's footsteps and has joined [KFOR] (channel 4) as its weekday morning Live Desk/Alert Center anchor.
