= Glynn Simmons =

American victim of wrongful conviction (1953–2026)

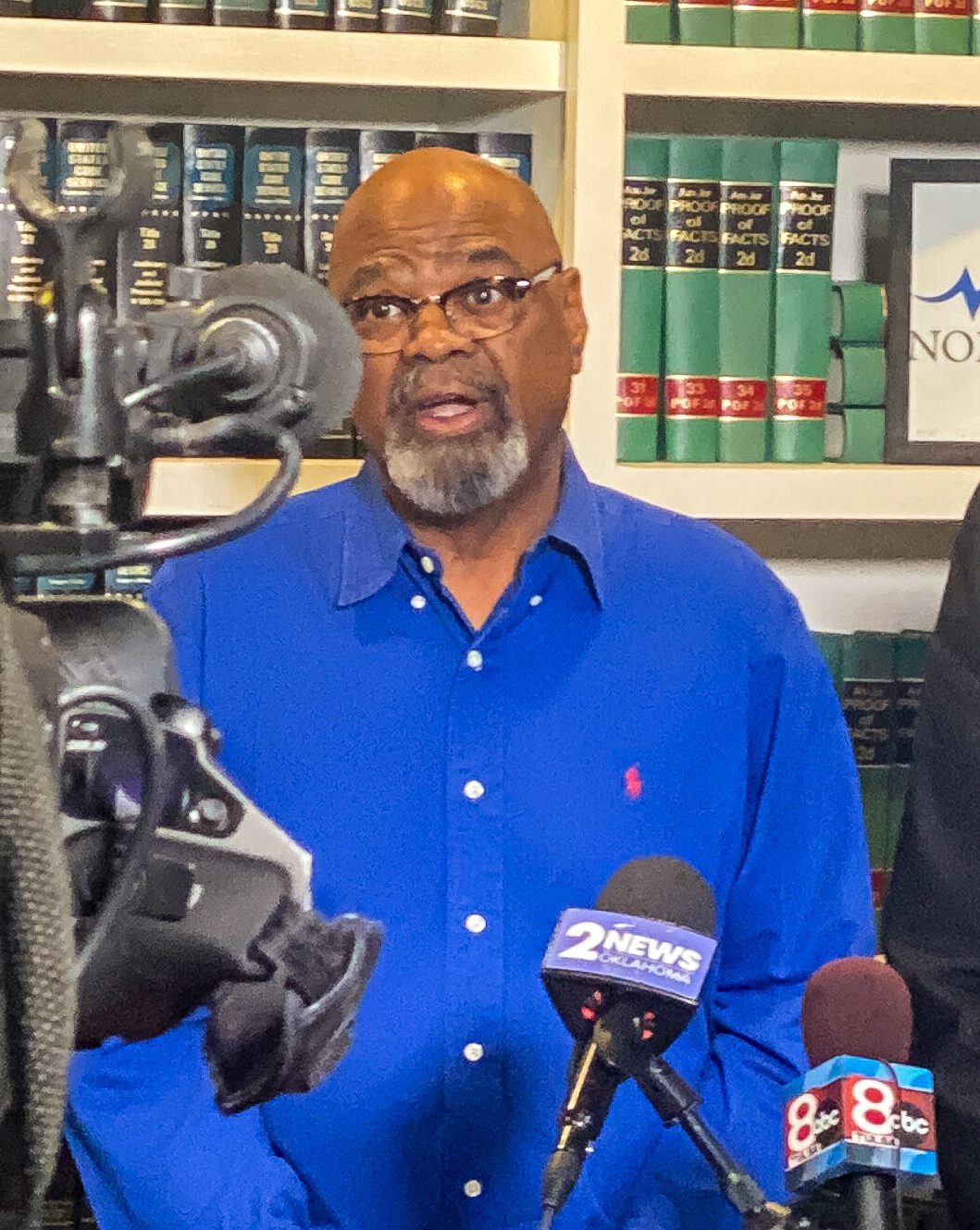
Simmons in 2023

Glynn Ray Simmons (1953 – October 2026) was an American man who was wrongfully convicted in the state of Oklahoma in 1975 of the 1974 murder of Carolyn Sue Rogers. After having been exonerated, he was released from prison in 2023 at the age of 70 after having been imprisoned for 48 years.

His imprisonment after wrongful conviction is believed to be the longest in U.S. history.

== Criminal case ==
On December 30, 1974, two armed men robbed a liquor store in Edmond, Oklahoma, and, as 30-year-old Carolyn Sue Rogers, a store clerk, picked up the telephone, one of the robbers shot her in the head and killed her. A customer, 18-year-old Belinda Brown, was also shot in the head, but survived.

During the investigation of this crime, police were also investigating a series of other similar robberies and a murder. On February 4, 1975, the bodies of two men were found in a rural area near Oklahoma City. On February 5, Leonard Patterson was arrested, and then confessed to the murders of the two men. Police learned that on January 19, 1975, Leonard Patterson was at a party at the home of Dorothy Norris in Oklahoma City. She was the aunt of 22-year-old Glynn Simmons, who had moved there from his home in Harvey, Louisiana, to take a job. The police began bringing in everyone they could find who had been at the party and putting them in lineups, including Simmons. Belinda Brown identified Simmons and 21-year-old Don Roberts, who had also been at the party, as the robbers of the liquor store in Edmond.

On February 8, 1975, following the lineups, police arrested Simmons and Roberts, and they were charged with capital murder. However, Simmons testified that on December 30, 1974, he was in Harvey, Louisiana, and spent the day playing pool with friends. His alibi was confirmed by four witnesses.

Nevertheless, on June 5, 1975, Simmons and Roberts were convicted of first degree murder. In July 1975, they both received mandatory death sentences. However, their death sentences were reduced to life in prison in 1977 after the U.S. Supreme Court ruled that Oklahoma's death penalty statute did not meet the standard that had been set by Gregg v. Georgia in 1976, since the sentences were imposed automatically upon conviction.

In 1995, Robert Mildfelt, the trial prosecutor, wrote a letter to Simmons saying that the only witness [Brown] who identified him had wanted to think about the identification "overnight." He wrote that Brown had described Simmons as more than six feet tall and over 200 pounds, "a physical description greatly different from Mr. Simmons [sic] stature at the time. The jury on that day at that time found him guilty, however [sic], quite candidly, it was one of the few cases I have been involved in that the verdict a week later could easily have been different." On two occasions, Mildfelt wrote letters to the Oklahoma Pardon and Parole Board supporting Simmons in his bid to be released on parole, but parole was repeatedly denied.

Simmons kept trying to prove his innocence, filing a motion for post-conviction relief that was denied in 1997. He filed a federal petition for a writ of habeas corpus in 1997, but it was also denied.

In January 2023, Simmons’ attorneys, Joseph Norwood and John Coyle, filed an amended application for post-conviction relief which cited the failure of the prosecution to disclose the police report which said that Brown had initially identified two other men and noted that in fact Brown had identified four other individuals during the eight lineup procedures. The motion also noted that in addition to the four witnesses who testified at the trial that Simmons was in Harvey, there were two other witnesses present who were to testify similarly but they did not after Simmons’ defense lawyer denied their testimony as cumulative. The petition included affidavits from five more people who said that they saw Simmons in Harvey at the time of the crime.

In April 2023, Oklahoma County District Attorney Vicki Behenna, who had been the head of the Oklahoma Innocence Project before being elected as district attorney in 2022, filed a motion seeking to vacate Simmons’ conviction. On July 20, District Court Judge Amy Palumbo vacated Simmons’ conviction and ordered a new trial. On July 22, Simmons was released on bond. On September 11, Behenna announced that the office would not seek to retry Simmons and dismissed the case. On September 19, Judge Palumbo granted a motion filed by Behenna to dismiss the case. In October, Simmons filed a motion seeking a declaration of innocence to then seek compensation from the state of Oklahoma. Oklahoma County District Court Judge Amy Palumbo issued such a declaration on December 19.

Simmons' co-defendant Don Roberts was released on parole in 2008 and Joseph Norwood said his firm would seek to vacate Roberts's conviction as well.

On August 13, 2024, Simmons was awarded $7,000,000 for wrongful conviction compensation.

== Death ==
Simmons died from colon cancer on October 28, 2026, at the age of 72.
