= Bob Dotson =

American television host and author

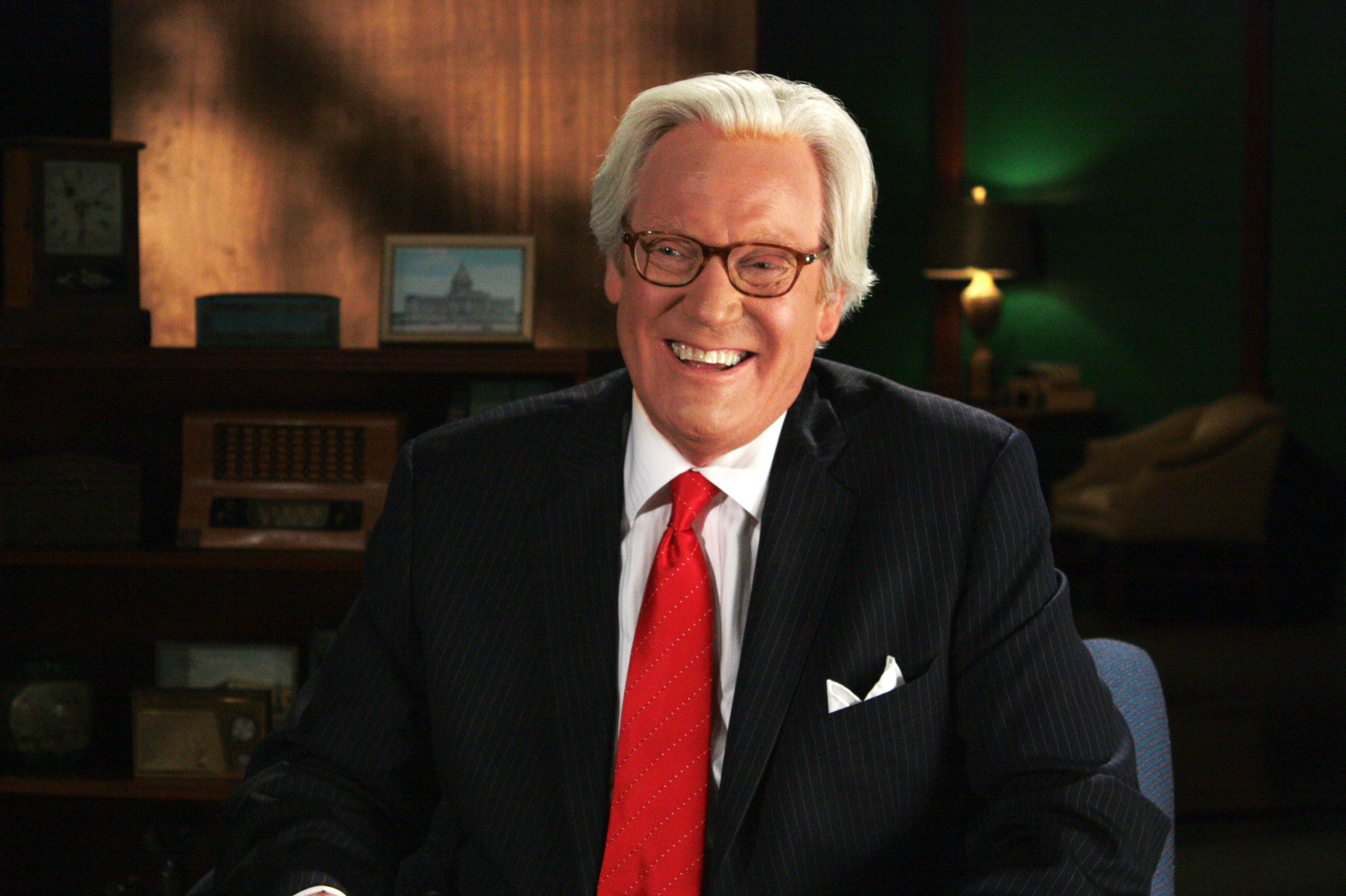
Bob Dotson

Robert Charles "Bob" Dotson (born October 3, 1946) is a New York Times best selling American author, teacher and retired television journalist. His long-running series, "The American Story with Bob Dotson," was a regular feature on NBC's Today show for 40 years.

== Early life and education ==
Dotson was born in St. Louis, Missouri, the son of Dottie Bailey, a singer who performed on NBC radio, and Bill Dotson, a janitor who dropped out of school in fifth grade, but attended night classes for 23 years, and later earned an honorary master's degree in Ophthalmics for his study of the eye. The morning of his second birthday, he awoke to discover he could not stand or walk. The family doctor diagnosed polio. Twenty thousand children would fall victim during the epidemic of 1948. Determined he would walk again, Dotson's mother drove him to rehab three days a week for years. His cast left scars still visible, but he learned to walk normally again.

Dotson graduated from Webster Groves High School in Webster Groves, Missouri in 1964. In 1968 Dotson received a Bachelor of Science in journalism and political science from the University of Kansas. In 1969 he earned a Master of Science degree in television and film from the S. I. Newhouse School of Public Communications of Syracuse University.

== Career ==
In June 2016 Dotson joined the faculty at the S. I. Newhouse School of Public Communications of Syracuse University.

On October 23, 2015 Dotson left NBC News, 40 years to the day he was hired in 1975. His "American Story" series became one of the most honored in network television history, winning more than 100 national and international awards.

On October 15, 2015 Rowman & Littlefield published the second edition of Dotson's journalism textbook, Make it Memorable, an update for the digital age. The book hit number one on the Amazon hot list.

On October 5, 2015 Dotson became a visiting professor at Regents University, London, and Webster University, Leiden, The Netherlands.

In September 2015 Dotson served as the first Stembler Visiting Professional at the School of Media and Journalism, University of North Carolina at Chapel Hill.

In April 2015 Dotson was a visiting professor on the Webster University campuses in Geneva, Switzerland, and Vienna, Austria.

In October 2014 Dotson was visiting professor at Webster University, St. Louis, Missouri.

In July 2014 Dotson was the keynote speaker at the Institute of Cultural Diplomacy conference, United Nations, New York, NY. He spoke about the American experience.

In September 2014 Dotson addressed the United Nations assembly, "People for Peace" in Seoul, South Korea.

In September 2012 Dotson was the David Letterman guest lecturer at Ball State University.

In March 2013 Penguin/Random House published Dotson's third book, American Story, a Lifetime Search for Ordinary People Doing Extraordinary Things. (25) The book became a New York Times Best Seller.

In July 2010 Dotson was a visiting lecturer at the Walkley Foundation and Network Seven Television in Sydney, Australia.

In December 2009 Dotson wrote and hosted an hour-long American Story Christmas special for MSNBC. It won a CINE Golden Eagle award for Best American Documentary.

In May 2000 Dotson moved to New York City and began reporting his "American Story" exclusively for the NBC Today Show. Bonus Books published his second book, Make it Memorable, Writing and Packaging TV News with Style.

In 1997 Dotson wrote, edited and hosted a series of half-hour programs about America on the Travel Channel.

In 1985 Atheneum published Dotson's first book, In Pursuit of the American Dream.

In September, 1979, Dotson began a series of video workshops for students attending Radio and Television News Directors Association conventions. Those workshops continued for 35 years.

In August, 1979, Dotson became an NBC News National Correspondent based in Atlanta working on American Story segments for the TODAY Show, Nightly News and several NBC News magazine programs.

In 1977 Dotson opened the first NBC News bureau in Dallas, Texas.

In 1975 Dotson joined NBC News as a Network Correspondent in Cleveland, Ohio.

In 1971 Dotson became Director of Special Projects at WKY-TV, now KFOR-TV, in Oklahoma City. He produced, wrote, edited and narrated 19 documentaries over the next four years.

In 1970 Dotson joined the faculty of the National Press Photographers Annual Workshop in Norman, Oklahoma. He is still on the faculty.

In 1969 Dotson joined WKY-TV, now (KFOR-TV) the NBC affiliate station in Oklahoma City, Oklahoma, as a reporter, photographer and Anchorman.

In 1967 Dotson applied for a news job at KMOX radio. The station sent him to work behind the a microphone at the St. Louis Zoo, announcing elephant and chimpanzee acts. American Story, a Lifetime Search for Ordinary People Doing Extraordinary Things (Penguin Random House, 2013), page 116

In 1966 Dotson became News Director of KFKU-KANU-FM in Lawrence, Kansas, and was a reporter and photographer for KMBC-TV in Kansas City, Missouri.

== Awards ==
In April 2019 Dotson was inducted into the Oklahoma Journalism Hall of Fame.

On April 15, 2017 Dotson was inducted into the St. Louis Media Hall of Fame for Television. He joined three previous St. Louis Media Hall of Fame inductees from NBC: Dave Garroway, Joe Garragiola and Bob Costas.

On April 23, 2015 Dotson received the William Allen White National Citation for long standing journalistic excellence in service to the profession and community. Past winners include Watergate reporter Bob Woodward, New York Times publisher Arthur Sulzberger and CBS News anchor Walter Cronkite.

In 2014 Dotson's third book, American Story, a Lifetime Search for Ordinary People Doing Extraordinary Things won the Christopher Award for Best Non-Fiction Book.

In March 2013 Penguin/Random House published Dotson's third book, American Story, a Lifetime Search for Ordinary People Doing Extraordinary Things. It became a New York Times Best Seller.

In 2011 The Society of Professional Journalists selected Dotson's online column writing as the best in the nation.

In December 2010 Dotson won a CINE Golden Eagle Award for Best American Television Documentary. His hour-long Christmas special aired on MSNBC.

In October 1999 Dotson received a Murrow Award from the Radio and Television Digital News Association for "Best Network Writing." He was awarded this honor a record six times: 2006, 2007, 2008, 2009, 2012.

In 1998 Dotson received the CINE Golden Eagle for Best Television Series – Bob Dotson's American Story.

In 1995 Dotson received two National Clarion Awards from Women in Communications for his work on the Susan Smith Trial and his American Story television series.

In 1991 Dotson received the CINE Golden Eagle Grand Prize for Best Documentary in International competitions – "El Capitan's Courage Climbers." The film won seven International Film Festivals.

In 1989 the National Press Photographers selected Dotson for the Sprague Award, its highest honor.

In 1974 Dotson earned his first national EMMY Award and was the Grand Prize recipient of both the Robert F. Kennedy and DuPont Columbia Awards for Best Television Program of 1973. His 90-minute documentary, "Through the Looking Glass Darkly," told the little known story of African-Americans in the Oklahoma territory and their contributions following Oklahoma Statehood.

In 1972 Dotson's film, "Still Got Life to Go," shot in an Oklahoma prison for juvenile offenders, was nominated for a National EMMY. The first of Dotson's 19 EMMY nominations during his television career.

== Bibliography ==
Dotson has written the following books:

- "Make it Memorable, Writing and Packaging Visual News with Style" 2015 Journalism Second edition updated for digital age
- "American Story, a Lifetime Search for Ordinary People Doing Extraordinary Things," 2013 "American Story"
- "Make it Memorable, Writing and Packaging TV News with Style" 2000 Journalism
- "In Pursuit of the American Dream" 1975 Cultural history

== American Story archive ==
All of Dotson's American stories can be viewed at www.myamericanstories.com Over the years, he saved more than six thousand of them, whenever his bosses, looking to save space, tossed them out. He preserved not just the stories themselves, but every field cassette. For three decades, they were maintained at his own expense in air-conditioned rooms—first in his basement then, as the collection grew, in warehouses. NBC donated that archive to the University of Oklahoma and Syracuse University in New York.

== Personal life ==
Dotson and his wife, Linda, live in New York City, Mystic, Connecticut and Greenville, South Carolina. They married on July 1, 1972, and had a daughter.
