= Oklahoma City Memorial Marathon =

Annual race in the United States held since 2001

- Date: April
- Location: Oklahoma City, Oklahoma, United States
- Event type: Road
- Distance: Marathon
- Established: 2001 (25 years ago)
- Website: Oklahoma City Memorial Marathon

The Oklahoma City Memorial Marathon is an annual marathon in Oklahoma City, OK that began in 2001. The event now hosts over 24,000 runners and walkers from every state and several foreign countries. The event consists of a marathon, half marathon, marathon relay (5 member teams), 5k, and kids marathon. The race is an official Boston Marathon qualifying event.

The Oklahoma City National Memorial & Museum, built for those affected by the 1995 Oklahoma City bombing, is the sole beneficiary of Oklahoma City Memorial Marathon event proceeds. This is the Memorial's largest fundraiser.

== History ==
The inaugural race was held in 2001 with around 5,000 participants.

The 2020 in-person edition of the race was canceled due to the coronavirus pandemic, with all entries automatically transferred to a virtual edition of the race, and all registrants given the option of transferring their entry to 2021 or 2022. (Note: It had initially been postponed to 2020.10.04.)

The 2021 race was hosted in October.

== Course ==
External image
- Course map of full marathon in 2016

The course begins at the Oklahoma City National Memorial & Museum, winds through Bricktown, the Capitol, Nichols Hills, and several of Oklahoma City's historic neighborhoods. Along the way, runners pass 168 banners, each bearing the name of one of the bombing victims.

The start line is on N. Harvey Ave., between NW 6th and NW 5th at the west entrance of the National Memorial.
