= Ben McCain =

American actor & broadcaster (born 1955)

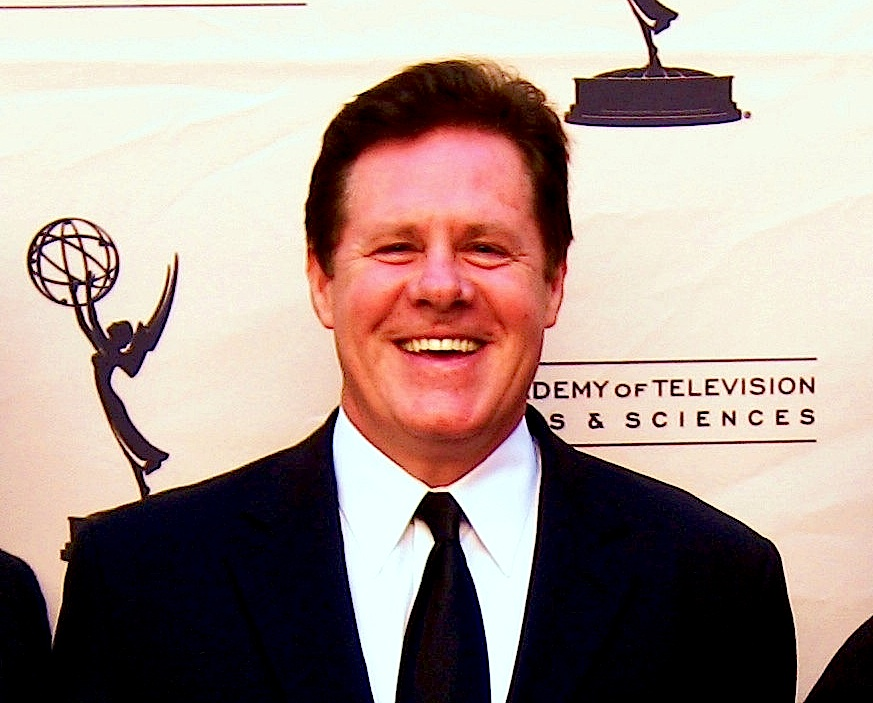
- McCain at the Los Angeles Area Emmy Awards (2011)

Background information
- Born: June 25, 1955 (age 71); Muleshoe, Texas, U.S.
- Origin: Bovina, Texas
- Occupations: Actor, TV host, producer, singer-songwriter
- Years active: 1973–present

Ben McCain (born 25 June 1955) is an American actor, broadcaster, producer and one half of The McCain Brothers, a singing-songwriting duo. McCain appeared as news anchor Aries West in MGM's comedy Bio-Dome, the character, Travis, in Roger Corman's remake Humanoids From The Deep, and the Mayor of Gold Lick in Bruce Campbell's My Name Is Bruce. Ben and his brother, Butch McCain, also wrote and performed the theme song in My Name is Bruce titled "The Legend of Guan Di". McCain had a recurring role as news anchor Brock Thompson in ABC's Lois & Clark: The New Adventures of Superman and another recurring role as newscaster Don MacDonald in SyFy's Black Scorpion.

== Early life ==
Born in Muleshoe, Texas, and raised on a farm near Bovina in Parmer County. McCain is a graduate of Bovina High School, South Plains College in Levelland, Texas, and West Texas State University now West Texas A&M University in Canyon, Texas.

== Career ==
Ben McCain and his brother, Butch McCain, co-hosted a morning television program in Oklahoma City from 1981 to 1987 at KTVY (NBC affiliate) and from 1987 to 1994 the brothers hosted "Good Morning Oklahoma" and anchored the noon newscast at KOCO-TV (ABC affiliate). Ben anchored the news and Butch served as the weather anchor.

While hosting their daily morning television program, the brothers appeared on the syndicated TV show Hee Haw twice in the 1980s as well as ABC soap operas General Hospital, All My Children and Loving.[3] Ben and his brother, Butch, made 3 appearances on General Hospital.

The McCain Brothers did live segments on the KCBS-TV morning show in Los Angeles in 2000.

The McCain Brothers have recorded four CDs on Rise and Shine Records. The country single, "If Love Was a Crime I Couldn't Get Arrested" went number one on 50,000-watt KOMA radio in 1985. They also hosted a syndicated TV music show called "The McCain Brothers Show."

Ben and his brother, Butch, have appeared in numerous films together including MGM's comedy Bio-Dome,[4] Roger Corman's Humanoids from the Deep and Bruce Campbell's My Name is Bruce, where they wrote and performed the theme song, "The Legend of Guan Di".[5] In the movie, Ben plays the mayor and Butch has dual roles as the sheriff and a uni-browed farmer. In a 1997 Daily Variety article, columnist Andrew Hindes described the McCain Brothers as "multi-hyphenated".[6]

McCain has been nominated twice for Los Angeles Area Emmy awards. The first time in 2010 as Producer and Host for the program "So-Cal's Best Iconic Movie Locations" and again in 2012 as Producer for the program "Leimert Park Today". McCain worked as a producer, host and reporter for Time Warner Cable from 2002 to 2012.

McCain narrated the audio book NICHOLAS: The Fantastic Origins of Santa Claus in 2013.

Ben McCain began co-anchoring a news show for Torrance CitiCable in 2000. On April 9, 2020, McCain began anchoring live COVID-19 updates for Torrance CitiCable. April 15, 2021 McCain announced that it would be his final time anchoring for Torrance CitiCable's "COVID-19 Today" stating that he was moving to Franklin, Tennessee, with his wife and son.

== Filmography ==
Year	Film	Role	Other notes
1985–1988	Nashville Now		
1988	Dark Before Dawn	(News Reporter)	
1993	General Hospital	Medical Examiner	
1996	Bio-Dome	Anchor Aries West	
1996	Humanoids From The Deep	Travis	
1997	Click (U.S. TV series)	Tofu Man #2	
1997	Midnight Blue (film)	Second Executive	
1995–1997	Lois & Clark: The New Adventures of Superman	Brock Thompson	9 episodes
1997	Two Came Back	Coast Guard Official	
1998	The Adventures of Pug and Zero	Sheriff	
1998	The Pretender	Jordon Brock	
1998	Outside Ozona	Radio Furniture Salesman	
1998	Under The Legs of Clouds	Preacher	
1999	The Sex Monster	Radio Shock Jock	
1999	Born Bad	Deputy	
2000	Martial Law	Airline Pilot	
2000	Arrest & Trial	Narrator	
2001	Skippy (2001 film)	TV Anchor	
2001	Accidents Don't Happen	Film Critic	
2001	Fire & Ice (2001 film)	Commentator	
2001	Black Scorpion	Don MacDonald	16 episodes
2002	Don't Let Go	Tex	
2005	KatiBird *Certifiable Crazy Person	Groundskeeper	
2005	Blood Deep	Officer Ben Lucas	
2007	My Name Is Bruce	Mayor	
2007	Stall 60 on the Sunset Strip	The Boss	
2008	Dragonlance: Dragons of Autumn Twilight	Elistan	
2008	Killer Tumbleweeds	Brock McDonald	
2009	Breaking News: The Invasion Begins!	Dack Tamblyn	
2010	Leave It on the Court	John Henderson	
2010	Love Chronicles: Secrets Revealed	Doctor	
2010	The Talking Head	Phil Rose	
2011	Fresh Starts 4 Stale People	Burt Kringle	
2012	The Amazing Adventures of the Living Corpse	Bruce	
2013	In Vacuo	Ron Shelby	
2013	Julian	Jack Cameron	
2014	"Homecoming"	Officer Ben Lucas	
2016	"House of Cards" (Season 4)	Radio Newscaster	
2018	"Call for Fire"	TV Newscaster Kevin Matney	
2019	Dead End	Cop # 2	
2022	"Negative Thoughts"	Radio Newscaster	
2023	Women, Guns and Ammo	Dr. Steel	
TBA	Killer Tumbleweeds 2	Brock MacDonald	

== Music ==
Ben and his brother, Butch form the singing-songwriting duo, The McCain Brothers. They have recorded 6 albums. Film legend Roger Corman was the first producer to use their songs in a movie. The single, "If Love Was a Crime I Couldn't Get Arrested", went number one on 50,000-watt KOMA radio in Oklahoma City. Ben and Butch also hosted a syndicated TV music program called The McCain Brothers Show.
