= The McCain Brothers =

- Years active: 1981–present
- Website: www.mccainbrothers.com

The McCain Brothers, a singing-songwriting duo, consisting of brothers Ben and Butch McCain, were born in Muleshoe, Texas, and raised on a farm near Bovina, Texas. The McCain Brothers wrote and recorded the theme song "The Legend of Guan Di" for Bruce Campbell's My Name Is Bruce. Variety described the McCain Brothers as "multi-hyphenated".

== Music ==
The McCain Brothers have released three full-length albums and one single on Rise and Shine Records. The single "If Love Was A Crime" was a pick hit in Billboard Magazine and went to number 1 on KOMA in Oklahoma City in 1985. In 2007, The McCain Brothers recorded The Legend of Guan Di, the theme song for the 2007 feature film, My Name is Bruce. McCain Brothers' songs have also been heard in Roger Corman's remake of Humanoids from the Deep, Accidents Don't Happen, Killer Tumbleweeds and Homecoming.

The McCain Brothers, according to The Oklahoman, opened concerts for Merle Haggard, Oak Ridge Boys, Bellamy Brothers, Don Williams, Ricky Skaggs, and Ronnie Milsap in the 1980s and 6 years of shows at the State Fair of Oklahoma in the late 80s and 90s.

== Television ==
Ben and younger brother Butch hosted a TV show in Oklahoma City for 12 years. They have performed their music and in skits on the syndicated TV show Hee Haw, The Tonight Show, The Keenen Ivory Wayans Show and Nashville Now. They have been seen on Good Morning America, The Today Show and they have hosted their own syndicated TV program, The McCain Brothers Show.

Country music superstar Garth Brooks made his first TV appearance on the McCain Brothers show airing on the NBC affiliate KTVY Oklahoma City in the mid-80s. The clip from the show aired in A&E’s documentary on Garth Brooks December 2, 2019.

Actor James Marsden made his TV debut with the McCain Brothers on Good Morning Oklahoma in 1991 on KOCO ABC Oklahoma City. Good Morning America aired a clip from the show February 13, 2020. Marsden was part of a high school morning news team requiring him to get up before school to join the McCain Brothers at 6 am Monday through Friday.

== Discography ==
Year	Title	Label
1984	Three Little Words	Rise and Shine
1993	The McCain Brothers	Rise and Shine
1999	Dirt Roads and Freeways	Rise and Shine
2012	Best... So Far	Rise and Shine
