= Butch McCain =

American actor & musician

- Butch McCain
- Born: Muleshoe, Texas, U.S.
- Years active: 1975–present
- Website: butchmccain.com

Butch McCain is an American actor, broadcaster, producer and one-half of the singing-songwriting team, The McCain Brothers. Butch appeared as TV reporter Joachim West in MGM's Bio-Dome, the character, Creel, in Roger Corman's remake Humanoids From The Deep, dual roles as a uni-browed farmer and deputy in Bruce Campbell's My Name Is Bruce, and most recently as Mayor Eddie Modry in Dragon Soldiers. Butch and his brother, Ben McCain, wrote and performed the theme song of My Name is Bruce titled "The Legend of Guan Di". McCain was named Best Weathercaster of the year two years in a row by the Colorado Broadcasters Association.

== Early life ==
Butch McCain was born in Muleshoe, Texas, and raised on a farm near Bovina in Parmer County, Texas. McCain is a graduate of Bovina High School, South Plains College in Levelland, Texas, and West Texas State University now West Texas A&M University in Canyon, Texas.

== Film and television ==
From 1981 to 1994, Butch McCain and his brother Ben McCain worked at NBC affiliate KTVY (now KFOR-TV) and eventually at ABC affiliate KOCO-TV, where they also anchored that station's noon newscast. The McCain brothers, with Ben anchoring the news and Butch forecasting the weather, hosted a morning TV show for 12 years (six each on KTVY and KOCO).

While hosting their daily morning television program, the brothers appeared on the syndicated TV show Hee Haw, as well as ABC soap operas General Hospital, All My Children, and Loving.

Butch and his brother Ben have appeared in numerous films together, including MGM's cult classic Bio-Dome, Roger Corman's Humanoids from the Deep, and Bruce Campbell's My Name is Bruce, where they wrote and performed the theme song, "The Legend of Guan Di". In the movie, Ben plays the mayor and Butch has dual roles as the sheriff and a uni-browed farmer. In a 1997, Daily Variety article, columnist Andrew Hindes described the McCain Brothers as "multi-hyphenated". Butch also appeared in Jonás Cuarón's Desierto Butch currently works in his underground studio doing voice-overs for clients all over the world while writing songs for he and his brother’s sixth album.

== Filmography ==
Year	Film	Role	Other notes
1985-1988	Nashville Now	Guest (3 Episodes)	
1986	Super Bloopers and Practical Jokes	Weatherman	
1988	Dark Before Dawn	News Producer	
1988	All My Children	Inside Trader	
1989	Loving	Bartender	
1993 - 1994	General Hospital	'Tex' the Cowboy, Policeman	
1996	Bio-Dome	Reporter Joachim West	
1996	In The House	Jennings	
1996	Humanoids From The Deep	Creel	
1997	Click (U.S. TV series)	Tofu Man #1	
1997	Midnight Blue (film)	First Executive	
1997	Born Bad	TV Reporter	
1997-1998	The Keenan Ivory Wayans Show	Various Skits (4 Episodes)	
1998	Mr. Murder	News Anchorman	
1998	Outside Ozona	Radio Furniture Salesman	
1998	Under the Legs of Clouds	Salesman	
1998	The Adventures of Pug and Zero	Outlaw Buck Toothman	
1998	Outside Ozona	Radio Furniture Salesman	
1998	Keenan and Kel	TV Anchorman	
1998	All That	The Love Referee (2 Episodes)	
1999	The Sex Monster	Radio Shock Jock	
1999	Shake, Rattle and Roll: An American Love Story	Young Dick Clark	
1999	Born Bad	News Reporter	
2000	The Extreme Adventures of Super Dave	Reporter	
2000-2002	The Tonight Show	Various Skits	
2000	Martial Law	Airline Pilot	
2001	Skippy (2001 film)	TV Reporter	
2001	Accidents Don't Happen	Disc Jockey	
2004	Uh Oh!	Pilot	
2007	My Name Is Bruce	Deputy / Farmer	
2008	Killer Tumbleweeds	Sheriff Billy Joe MacDonald	
2015	Desierto	Radio Talk Show Host	
2015	A Balanced Life	Voice of God (Voice)	
2016	Callback	Double Thunder Waffle Maker(Voice)	
2017	The Myth Seekers: The Legacy of Vulcan (Video Game)	(Voice)	
2017	Indelible Winter	Narration	
2019	Sullivan	Game Announcer(Voice)	
2019	The Vaxx	Clint Campbell	
2020	Dragon Soldiers	Mayor Eddie Mordry	
2021	Hit Job	Additional Voices	
2021-2024	Operation Healing Heroes	Narrator	
2021	Realm of Terracotta	Opening narration (voice)	Also known as The Last Warrior
2021	Jurassic Hunt	Corrigan	
2023	Women, Guns and Ammo	Announcer	
2023	Glowzies	Old Mose	
2024	Strangers of My Imagination	Game announcer	
2026	Sun Fall	Harland	Short film
TBA	Killer Tumbleweeds 2	Sheriff Billy Joe MacDonald	

== Music ==
Butch and his brother, Ben form the singing-songwriting duo, The McCain Brothers. They have recorded 6 albums. Film legend Roger Corman was the first producer to use their songs in a movie. The single, "If Love Was a Crime I Couldn't Get Arrested", went number one on 50,000-watt KOMA radio in Oklahoma City. Butch and Ben also hosted a syndicated TV music program called The McCain Brothers Show. They also hosted a syndicated TV music show called The McCain Brothers Show.
