= Parmerton, Texas =

Coordinates: 34°34′47″N 102°48′09″W

Parmerton is a ghost town in Parmer County, Texas, United States. It was originally known as Parmer Switch when the Pecos Valley and Northern Texas Railway built a line through the area in 1898 and it was named for Martin Parmer. The town was composed of 200 acres of land formerly owned by the XIT Ranch and had been used for wheat farming. A one-story courthouse was built at the midway point between Bovina and Friona and a post office was established in September 1907, shortly after Parmerton was voted Parmer County seat. After significant political intrigue, a second election was held in December 1907, after which Parmerton was stripped of its status in favor of Farwell. The post office closed in 1908 and Parmerton went into decline; today, nothing remains except for an historical marker and a railroad switch.
