= Benjy Dial =

American football player (1943–2001)

No. 20, 4, 9, 13, 14
- Position: Quarterback

Personal information
- Born: May 21, 1943; Hall County, Texas, U.S.
- Died: April 5, 2001 (aged 57); Dallas, Texas, U.S.
- Listed height: 6 ft 1 in (1.85 m)
- Listed weight: 185 lb (84 kg)

Career information
- High school: Farwell (Farwell, Texas)
- College: Eastern New Mexico
- NFL draft: 1966: 13th round, 188th overall pick

Career history
- Pittsburgh Steelers (1966–1967)*; Rhode Island Steelers (1966); Wheeling Ironmen (1966); Philadelphia Eagles (1967); Charleston Rockets (1967); Pottstown Firebirds (1968–1969); Philadelphia Eagles (1969)*; Washington Redskins (1970)*; Winnipeg Blue Bombers (1970–1971)
- * Offseason or practice squad member only
- Stats at Pro Football Reference

Benjamin Franklin Dial (May 21, 1943 – April 5, 2001) was an American professional football player who was a quarterback for one season with the Philadelphia Eagles of the National Football League (NFL). He was selected by the Pittsburgh Steelers in the thirteenth round of the 1966 NFL draft after playing college football for the Eastern New Mexico Greyhounds. Dial was also a member of the Winnipeg Blue Bombers of the Canadian Football League, as well as teams from various other leagues.

== Early life and college ==
Benjamin Franklin Dial was born on May 21, 1943, in Hall County, Texas. He attended Farwell High School in Farwell, Texas.

He played college football at Eastern New Mexico University. He was inducted into the school's athletics hall of fame in 2001.

== Professional career ==
Dial was selected by the Pittsburgh Steelers in the 13th round, with the 188th overall pick, of the 1966 NFL draft. He was signed by the Steelers twice in 1966 and also released twice. He also played for the Steelers' minor league affiliate, the Rhode Island Steelers of the Atlantic Coast Football League (ACFL) during the 1966 ACFL season. Dial played in seven games for the Wheeling Ironmen of the Continental Football League (COFL) during the 1966 COFL season as well, completing 74 of 154 passes (48.1%) for 867 yards, five touchdowns, and 13 interceptions. He signed with the Steelers again in 1967 but was also released again.

Dial signed with the Philadelphia Eagles of the NFL in 1967 but was later released and re-signed to the Eagles' taxi squad. Overall, he played in one game for the Eagles during the 1967 NFL season, completing one of three passes for five yards. He also played for the Charleston Rockets of the COFL in 1967, recording three completions on seven passing attempts (42.9%) for 45 yards, two touchdowns, and one interception. He was released by the Eagles in 1968.

Dial played for the Pottstown Firebirds of the ACFL from 1968 to 1969. In 1968, he totaled 109 completions on 215 passing attempts (50.7%) for 1,457 yards, ten touchdowns, and eight interceptions while also rushing for two touchdowns. In 1969, he completed 94 of 169 passes (55.6%) for 1,364 yards, 17 touchdowns, and three interceptions while rushing for five touchdowns as well.

Dial was signed by the Eagles again in 1969 but was later released.

He signed with the NFL's Washington Redskins in 1970 but was later released on September 1, 1970.

Dial then played in seven games for the Winnipeg Blue Bombers of the Canadian Football League (CFL) during the 1970 CFL season, accumulating 45 completions on 89 passing attempts (50.6%) for 597 yards, one touchdown, and seven interceptions. He also scored one rushing touchdown and lost three fumbles. In 1971, he played in seven games for the Blue Bombers for the second consecutive season, completing 15 of 41 passes (36.6%) for 252 yards, two touchdowns, and three interceptions.

== Later life ==
Dial later became a high school football coach in Texas. He died on April 5, 2001, in Dallas, Texas.
