= Farwell High School =

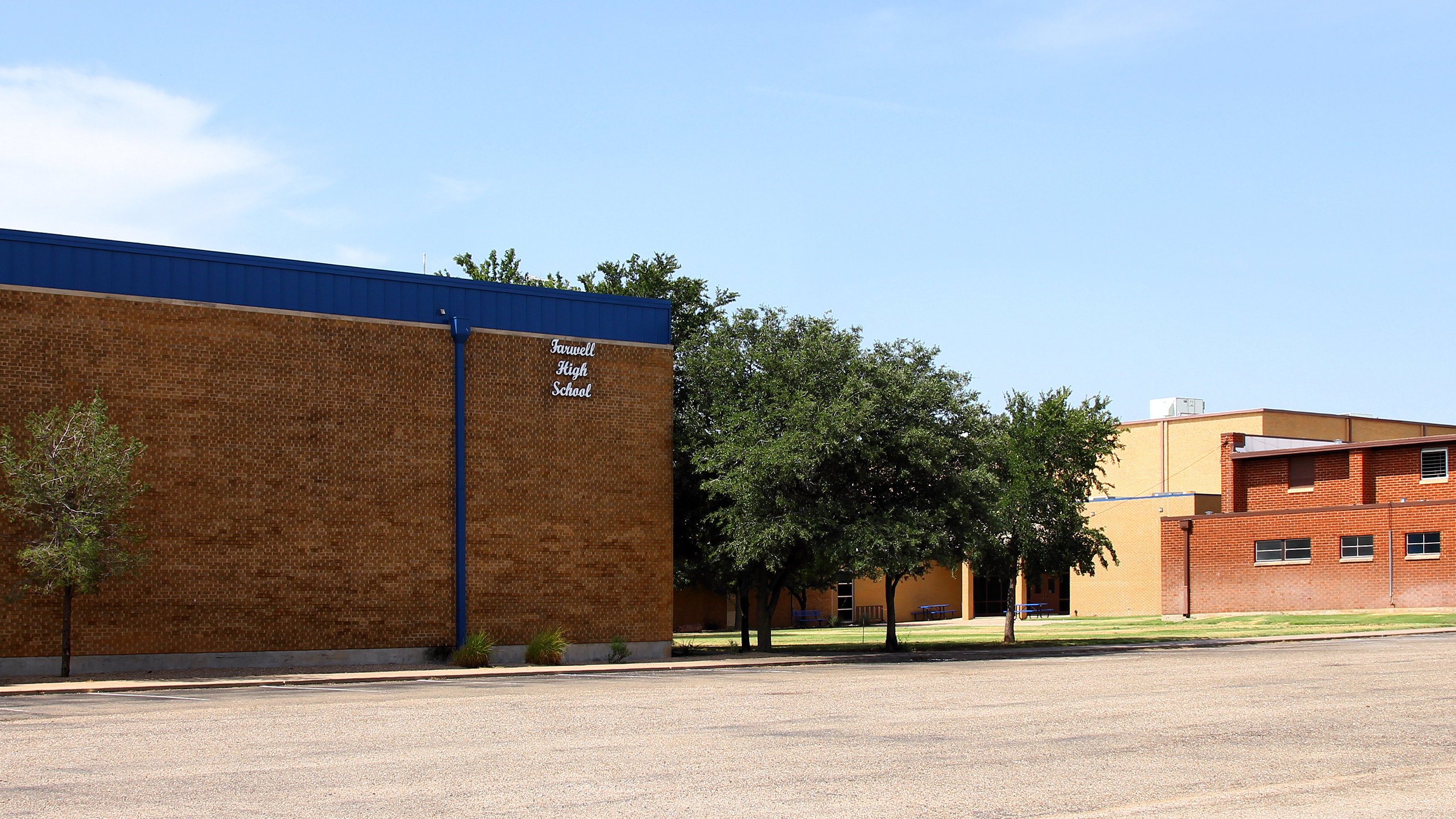

Location
- 801 Ave G Farwell, Texas 79325; United States; 34.380202°N 103.034357°W

Information
- School type: Public high school
- School district: Farwell Independent School District
- Principal: Coby Norman
- Staff: 22.49 (FTE)
- Grades: 9-12
- Enrollment: 172 (2023–2024)
- Student to teacher ratio: 7.65
- Colors: Blue & White
- Athletics conference: UIL Class 2A
- Mascot: Steers/Lady Blue
- Website: Farwell High School website

Farwell High School is a public high school located in Farwell, Texas, USA. It is part of the Farwell Independent School District located in west central Parmer County and classified as a 2A school by the UIL. In 2015, the school was rated "Met Standard" by the Texas Education Agency.

== Athletics ==
Farwell High School competes in these sports:

- Basketball
- Cross Country
- Football
- Golf
- Powerlifting
- Track and Field

=== State titles ===
- Girls Basketball:
  - 2000(2A)
- Girls Golf:
  - 1975(1A), 1976(1A), 1977(1A), 1980(1A)
