= Lazbuddie High School =

Coordinates: 34.393053°N 102.611422°W

Location
- 675 FM 1172; Lazbuddie, Texas 79053-0009; United States

Information
- School type: Public high school
- School district: Lazbuddie Independent School District
- Superintendent: Brad Jones
- Principal: Stacy Jones
- Staff: 14.62 (FTE)
- Grades: PK-12
- Enrollment: 130 (2024-2025)
- Student to teacher ratio: 8.89
- Colors: Orange and black
- Athletics conference: UIL Class A
- Mascot: Longhorn
- Yearbook: The Longhorn
- Website: Lazbuddie High School

Lazbuddie High School or Lazbuddie School is a public Pre-K through 12th Grade School located in Lazbuddie, Texas (USA) and is classified as a 1A school by the UIL. It is part of the Lazbuddie Independent School District located in southeastern Parmer County. In 2015, the school was rated "Met Standard" by the Texas Education Agency.

== Athletics ==
The Lazbuddie Longhorns compete in cross country, 6-man football, basketball, golf, tennis, and track & field.

=== State Titles ===
- Boys track
  - 1961(B)
- UIL Academics Computer Science Team- Jarah Redwine, Rochelle Rice, Craig Russell 1992-93
- UIL Academics Accounting Team- Marisol Godinez, Socorro Reyes, Kimberly Smith 1992-1993
- UIL Academics Accounting Team- Blake Mimms, Dawn Weir, Heath Brown 1993-1994
- UIL Academics Accounting Team- Jeremy Jones, Edward Terry, Ivette Reyes 1994-1995
- UIL Academics Accounting Team- Joshua McDonald, Shena Seaton, Leah Turner 1996-1997
- UIL Academics Accounting Team- Leah Turner, Savannah Black, Veronica Mata 1999-2000
- UIL Academics Accounting Team- Kati Mimms, Savannah Black, Shawndee Nichols 2000-2001
- Boys Shotput State Champion 2022- Theodore Chavez
- UIL Academics News Writing 2024 Brynlie Cleavinger, State Champion
- Boys Hurdles 2024 Ezekiel Kasel, Silver Medalist in 110M and 300M Hurdles

== Band ==
- Marching Band Sweepstakes Champions -
  - 1989(1A)
