= Bob Kelley (American football) =

American football player (born 1930)

No. 50, 44
- Position: Center

Personal information
- Born: May 8, 1930; Hereford, Texas, U.S.
- Died: June 26, 2025 (aged 95); Salinas, California, U.S.
- Listed height: 6 ft 3 in (1.91 m)
- Listed weight: 222 lb (101 kg)

Career information
- High school: Bovina (TX)
- College: West Texas A&M (1948–1951)
- NFL draft: 1952: 25th round, 293rd overall pick

Career history
- Philadelphia Eagles (1955–1956); Hamilton Tiger-Cats (1957-1958)

Career NFL statistics
- Games played: 24
- Games started: 24
- Fumble recoveries: 3
- Stats at Pro Football Reference

Robert Kelley (May 8, 1930 – June 26, 2025) is an American former professional football player who was a center for the Philadelphia Eagles of the National Football League (NFL). He played college football for the West Texas A&M Buffaloes, having previously attended Bovina High School.
