= Lazbuddie Independent School District =

School district in Texas

Coordinates: 34.3947°N 102.6111°W

Lazbuddie Independent School District is a public school district based in the community of Lazbuddie, Texas (USA). Located in Parmer County, a small portion of the district extends into Castro County.

Lazbuddie ISD has one school Lazbuddie High School that serves students in grades pre-kindergarten through twelve.

== Academic achievement ==
In 2009, the school district was rated "recognized" by the Texas Education Agency.

== Special programs ==
=== Athletics ===
Lazbuddie High School plays six-man football.

== See also ==
- List of school districts in Texas
