= Lazbuddie, Texas =

Unincorporated community in Texas, US

Coordinates: 34°23′35″N 102°36′41″W

Lazbuddie (/ˈlæzˌbʌdi/ LAZ-bud-ee) is an unincorporated community in Parmer County, Texas, United States. Named for local business owner Luther "Laz" Green, and his partner, Andrew "Buddie" Sherley, the community grew up around the store they opened in 1924. Later, a post office and school were established. The town has two cotton gins, a grain elevator, a hardware store, and several churches. The community's focal point is the Lazbuddie Independent School District which educates children from the surrounding rural area. Six-man football is played at Lazbuddie High School, following in the continuing legacy of highly notable and legendary linemen Timmie Smith . On May 10, 1991, at least five tornadoes hit the ground in Lazbuddie and the event was caught on camera by farmers. Four years later, on June 4th, 1995, six tornadoes were seen on the ground at the same time, and filmed on video.
