= Farwell Independent School District =

School district in Texas

Farwell Independent School District is a public school district based in Farwell, Texas (USA).

Located in Parmer County, a small portion of the district extends into Bailey County.

In tribute to the school district's (and city's) namesake, the owners of the XIT Ranch, the school mascot is the steer.

In 2009, the school district was rated "academically acceptable" by the Texas Education Agency.

== Controversy ==
In July 2024, the ACLU of Texas sent Farwell Independent School District a letter, alleging that the district's 2023–2024 dress and grooming code appeared to violate the Texas CROWN Act, a state law which prohibits racial discrimination based on hair texture or styles, and asking the district to revise its policies for the 2024–2025 school year.

== Schools ==
- Farwell High School (Grades 9-12)
- Farwell Junior High (Grades 6-8)
- Farwell Elementary (Grades PK-5)
