= Farwell, Texas =

- City
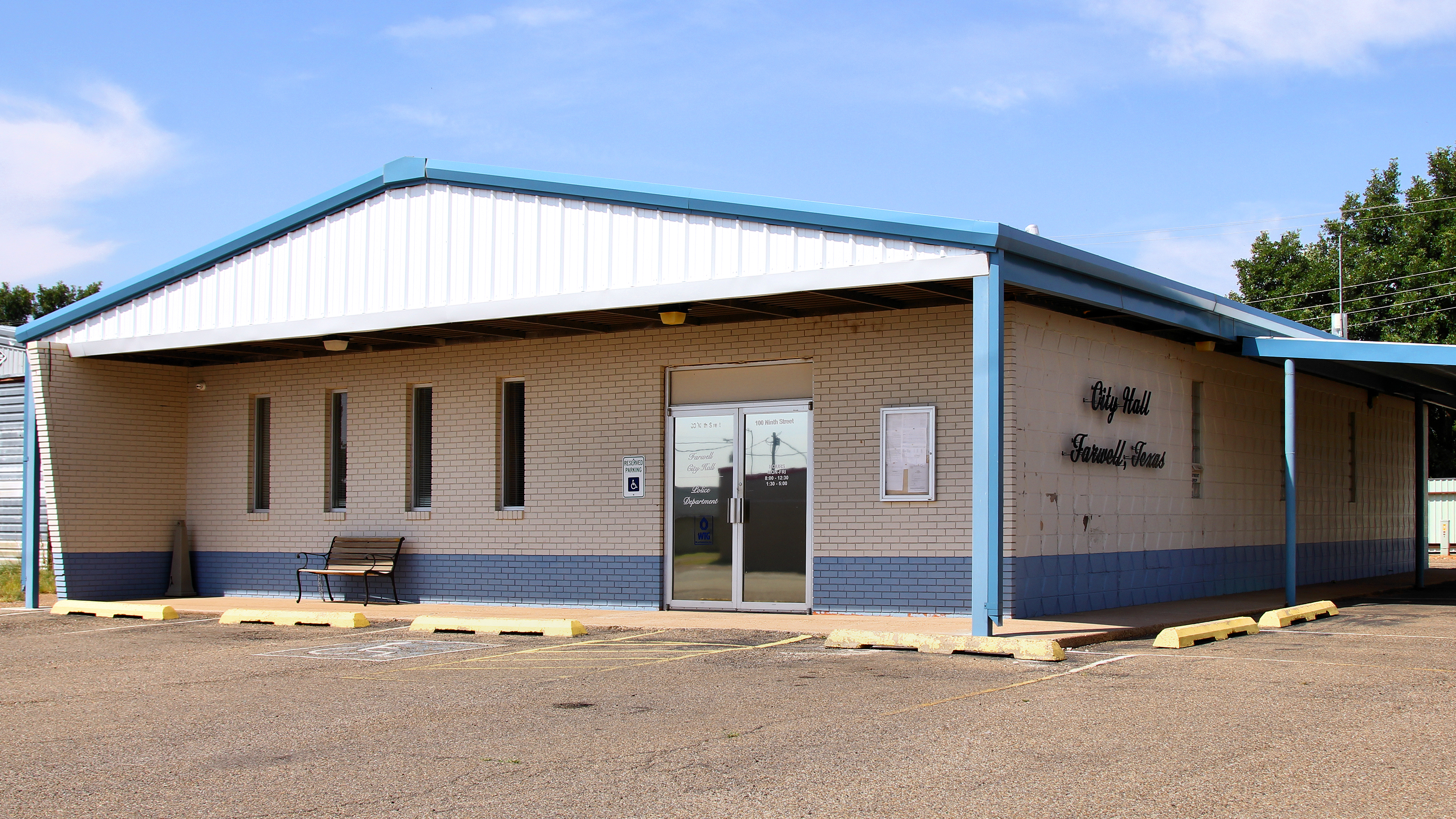
- Farwell City Hall

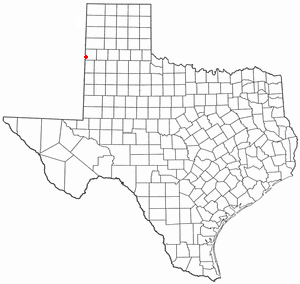
- Location of Farwell, Texas

- Coordinates: 34°22′59″N 103°2′18″W
- Country: United States
- State: Texas
- County: Parmer

Area
  - Total: 0.82 sq mi (2.13 km^{2})
  - Land: 0.82 sq mi (2.13 km^{2})
  - Water: 0 sq mi (0.00 km^{2})
- Elevation: 4,144 ft (1,263 m)

Population (2020)
  - Total: 1,425
  - Density: 1,730/sq mi (669/km^{2})
- Time zone: UTC-6 (Central (CST))
  - Summer (DST): UTC-5 (CDT)
- ZIP code: 79325
- Area code: 806
- FIPS code: 48-25548
- GNIS feature ID: 1357260
- Website: https://farwell.texas.gov/

Farwell is a city in and the county seat of Parmer County, Texas, United States. Its population was 1,425 at the 2020 census. The city is located on the Texas-New Mexico border with the city of Texico, New Mexico across the border.

== History ==
Farwell began as a cow camp for the XIT Ranch, a huge ranch that was established in 1880. Farwell was named for brothers Charles B. and John V. Farwell of Lake Forest, Illinois, who built the Texas State Capitol building in exchange for 3,050,000 acres (12,300 km^{2}) of ranchland. That region of Texas had been controlled by the Comanche from about 1725, when they defeated the Apache and forced them to migrate to the [Sierra Blanca range] in New Mexico and to other regions [the southernmost point of the Rockies is near Santa Fe]. The Red River War of 1874–1875—the biggest military operation the U.S. had between the Civil War and World War One—had five armies converge on that part of the High Plains, ultimately defeating the main Comanche force in Palo Duro Canyon (80 mi northeast of Farwell) by driving off and slaughtering the Comanches' horses.

The Farwell brothers established the XIT on their new land, ultimately employing 800 cowboys, stringing over 6,000 miles of barbed wire, and hiring former Texas Rangers to defeat the hundreds of cattle rustlers operating across the state line in the New Mexico territory. Many researchers hold that the XIT ultimately failed because of that massive rustling operation, ultimately persuading stockholders to begin selling off the ranch to families who came to that part of the High Plains drawn by the cheap price of land. When the cow camp that would become Farwell was established is not documented, but when Parmer County was created in 1907 (previously part of Deaf Smith County to its north), the election was held for county seat in a contest among Farwell, Bovina, Parmerton, and Friona, all to Farwell's northeast, all which had started as cow camps, but had varying success thus far in attracting settlers who ran saloons, stores, stables, and other services for the cowboys. Parmerton was initially voted county seat that year, and a one-story courthouse was built there.

The election was hotly contested by politicians in the other towns, so a new vote was scheduled. Cowboys, who were the largest demographic, lived in their saddles and sleeping bags most of the time, with no fixed address. A new regulation was established that each man would vote in the place where he did his laundry. Farwell, possessing the only laundry at that time, thus received all the cowboy votes, though Friona was, and remains, about four times the size of Farwell, so Farwell became county seat in the 1908 vote. The Farwell courthouse was erected quickly thereafter. When the decision was made to begin selling off the XIT to settlers, they would arrive in Farwell on the railroad, which had reached there in 1899, linking rail to the east with rail to the west of the Rockies Mountains via the track laid between Farwell and Belen, New Mexico. Families from across America arrived by train, stayed in the four-story Farwell Hotel, and toured the available homestead sites by touring cars.

Many of the families then traveled to Farwell and the rest of the region in covered wagons and established their homes in dugouts in the prairie soil (no stone or trees indigenous to the area were available for construction). Dry-land farming and herding were always risky, but families persevered year by year, often relying entirely on their small windmill pumping enough water for the home, a milk cow, some chickens, a few fruit trees, and vegetable gardens when crops and cattle withered during droughts and wind storms.

== Geography ==
Farwell lies on the level plains of the Llano Estacado at 34°22′59″N 103°2′18″W (34.382919, –103.038339). According to the United States Census Bureau, the city has a total area of 0.8 square miles (2.1 km^{2}), all land.

It is located 10 miles (16 km) east of Clovis, New Mexico, 88 miles (142 km) northwest of Lubbock, Texas, and 95 mi (152.888 km) southwest of Amarillo, Texas. It lies at the junction of two branches of the BNSF Railway from Belen. One branch goes northeast toward Amarillo and the Midwest; the other southeast toward Lubbock and the Texas Gulf Coast.

For years, a dispute had been simmering over which state Farwell (and her sister city on the other side of the state line, Texico) is lawfully a part of: Texas or New Mexico. The straight north–south border between the two states was originally defined as the 103rd meridian, but the 1859 survey that was supposed to mark that boundary mistakenly set the border between 2.29 and 3.77 miles too far west of that line, making the current towns of Texline, Farwell, Bledsoe, Bronco and a part of Glenrio appear to be within Texas. New Mexico's short border with Oklahoma, in contrast, was surveyed on the correct meridian. New Mexico's draft constitution in 1910 stated that the border is on the 103rd meridian as intended. The disputed strip, hundreds of miles long, includes parts of valuable oilfields of the Permian Basin. A bill was passed in the New Mexico Senate to fund and file a lawsuit in the U.S. Supreme Court to recover the strip from Texas, but the bill did not become law. Today, land in the strip is included in Texas land surveys and all purposes is taxed and governed by the State of Texas.

== Demographics ==
Historical population
Census	Pop.	Note	%±
1960	1,009		—
1970	1,185		17.4%
1980	1,354		14.3%
1990	1,373		1.4%
2000	1,364		−0.7%
2010	1,363		−0.1%
2020	1,425		4.5%
U.S. Decennial Census

=== 2020 census ===
As of the 2020 census, Farwell had a population of 1,425, 519 households, and 358 families. The median age was 40.1 years, 22.7% of residents were under the age of 18, and 20.0% of residents were 65 years of age or older. For every 100 females there were 100.1 males, and for every 100 females age 18 and over there were 93.8 males age 18 and over.

0.0% of residents lived in urban areas, while 100.0% lived in rural areas.

There were 519 households in Farwell, of which 35.1% had children under the age of 18 living in them. Of all households, 52.6% were married-couple households, 17.1% were households with a male householder and no spouse or partner present, and 27.4% were households with a female householder and no spouse or partner present. About 30.2% of all households were made up of individuals and 15.6% had someone living alone who was 65 years of age or older.

There were 599 housing units, of which 13.4% were vacant. The homeowner vacancy rate was 2.8% and the rental vacancy rate was 14.5%.

Racial composition as of the 2020 census
Race	Number	Percent
White	1,185	83.2%
Black or African American	9	0.6%
American Indian and Alaska Native	20	1.4%
Asian	3	0.2%
Native Hawaiian and Other Pacific Islander	0	0.0%
Some other race	131	9.2%
Two or more races	77	5.4%
Hispanic or Latino (of any race)	654	45.9%

=== 2000 census ===
As of the census of 2000, 1,364 people, 499 households, and 346 families were residing in the city. The population density was 1,669 people/sq mi (642/km^{2}). The 560 housing units averaged 684/sq mi (264/km^{2}). The racial makeup of the city was 75.00% White, 0.44% African American, 0.51% Native American, 1.03% Asian, 20.82% from other races, and 2.20% from two or more races. Hispanics or Latinos of any race were 31.96% of the population.

Of the 499 households, 34.9% had children under the age of 18 living with them, 56.9% were married couples living together, 9.6% had a female householder with no husband present, and 30.5% were not families. About 28.1% of all households were made up of individuals, and 17.2% had someone living alone who was 65 years of age or older. The average household size was 2.58, and the average family size was 3.18.

In the city, the age distribution was 27.9% under 18, 6.8% from 18 to 24, 24.8% from 25 to 44, 20.6% from 45 to 64, and 19.9% who were 65 or older. The median age was 39 years. For every 100 females, there were 88.7 males. For every 100 females age 18 and over, there were 80.9 males.

The median income for a household in the city was $29,808, and for a family was $34,676. Males had a median income of $27,448 versus $21,181 for females. The per capita income for the city was $15,875. About 13.9% of families and 16.7% of the population were below the poverty line, including 22.8% of those under age 18 and 13.7% of those age 65 or over.

== Education ==
The City of Farwell is served by the Farwell Independent School District.

== Notable person ==
- Charlie Phillips, singer, songwriter

== Gallery ==
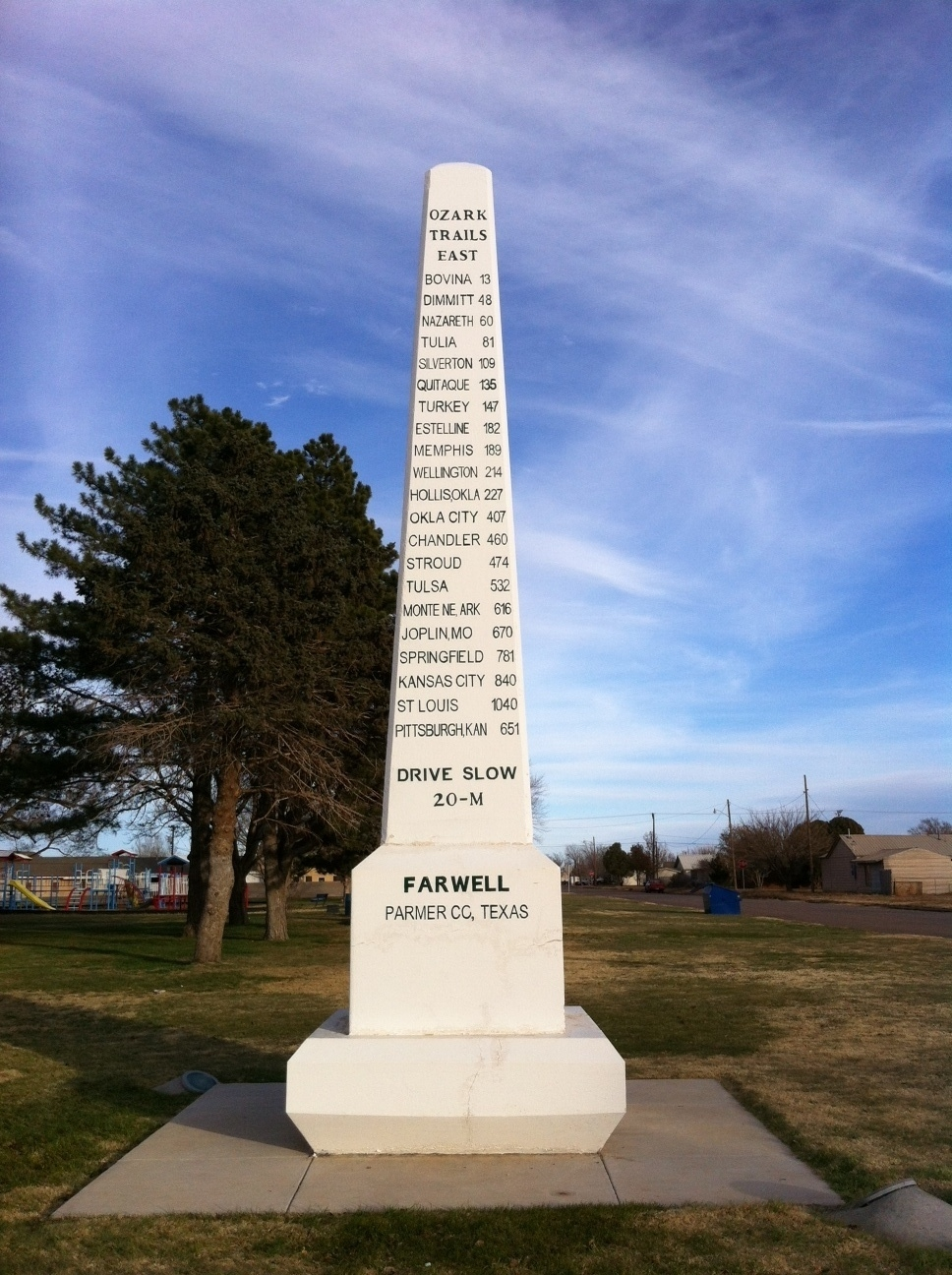
Obelisk commemorating Ozark Trail in Farwell, Texas

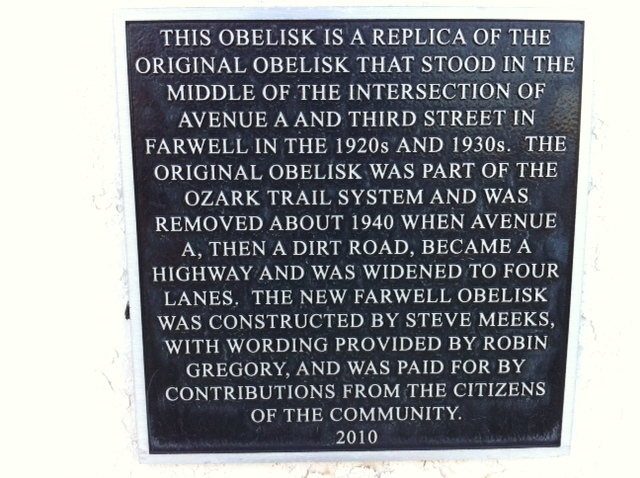
Plaque on Ozark Trail

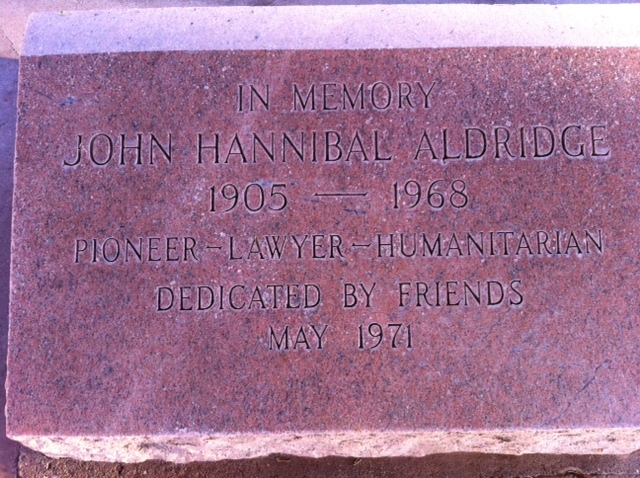
Monument honoring early pioneer in Farwell

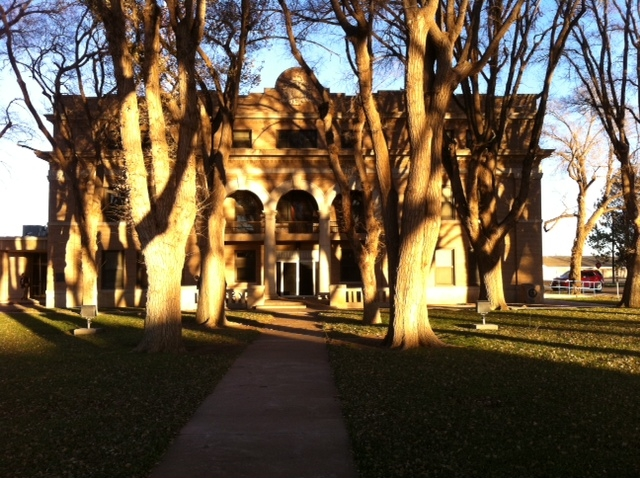
Parmer County Courthouse

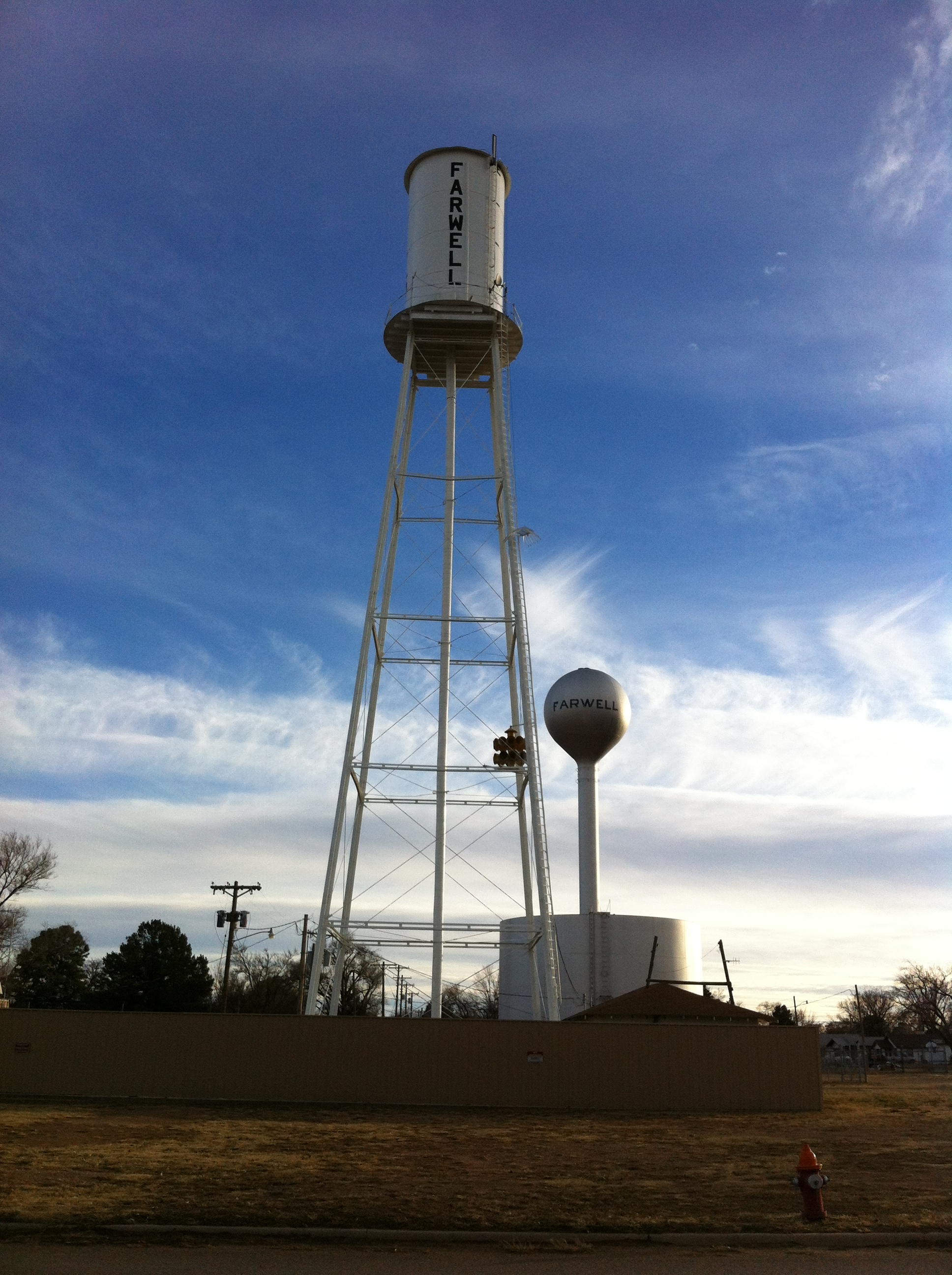
Two water towers in Farwell

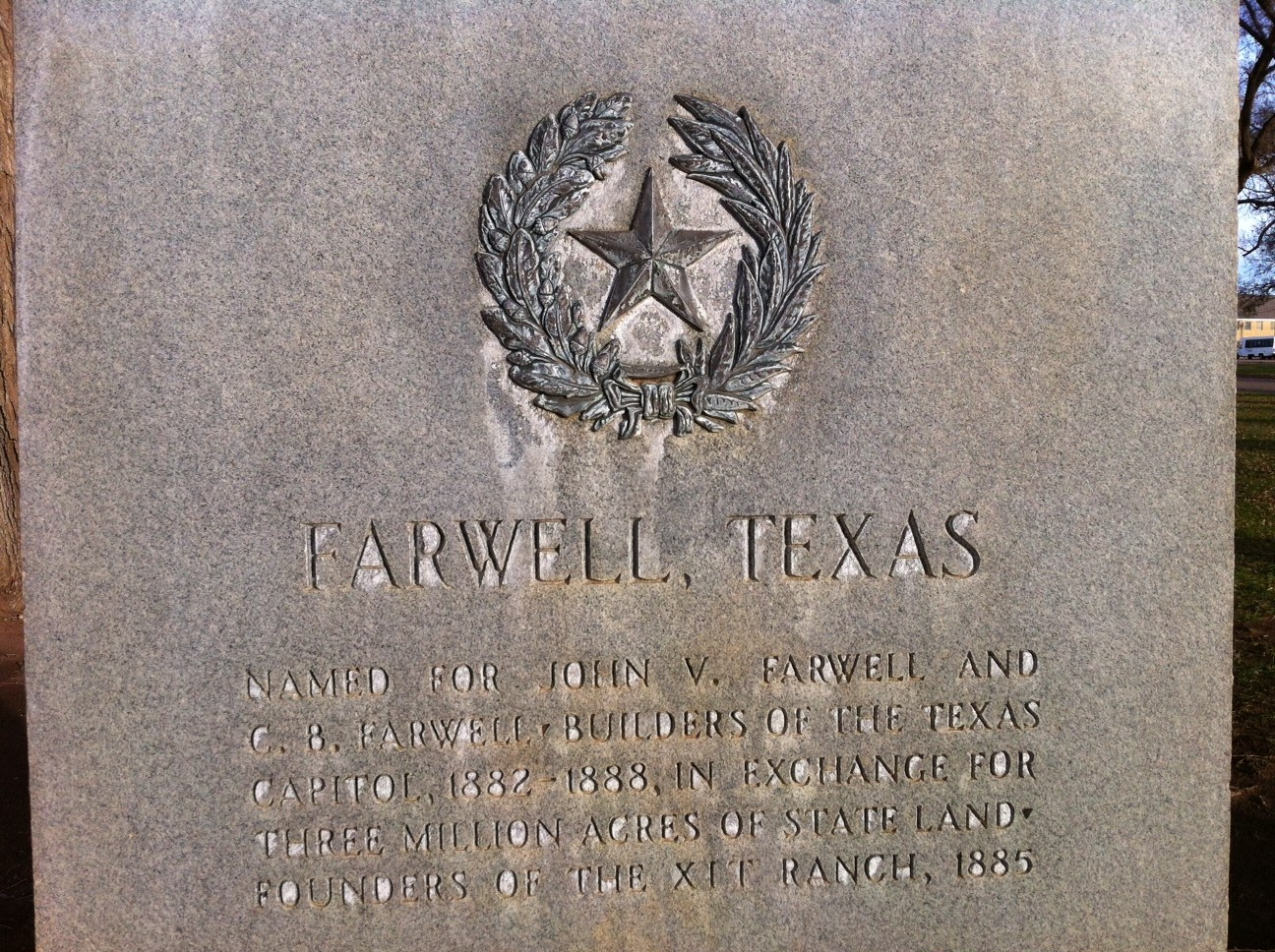
Monument commemorating the Farwell brothers for whom the town is named, founders of the XIT Ranch

Spanish poster in Farwell, evidence of growing Spanish-speaking population
