= Noyo, California =

Unincorporated community in California, United States

Noyo
- Unincorporated community
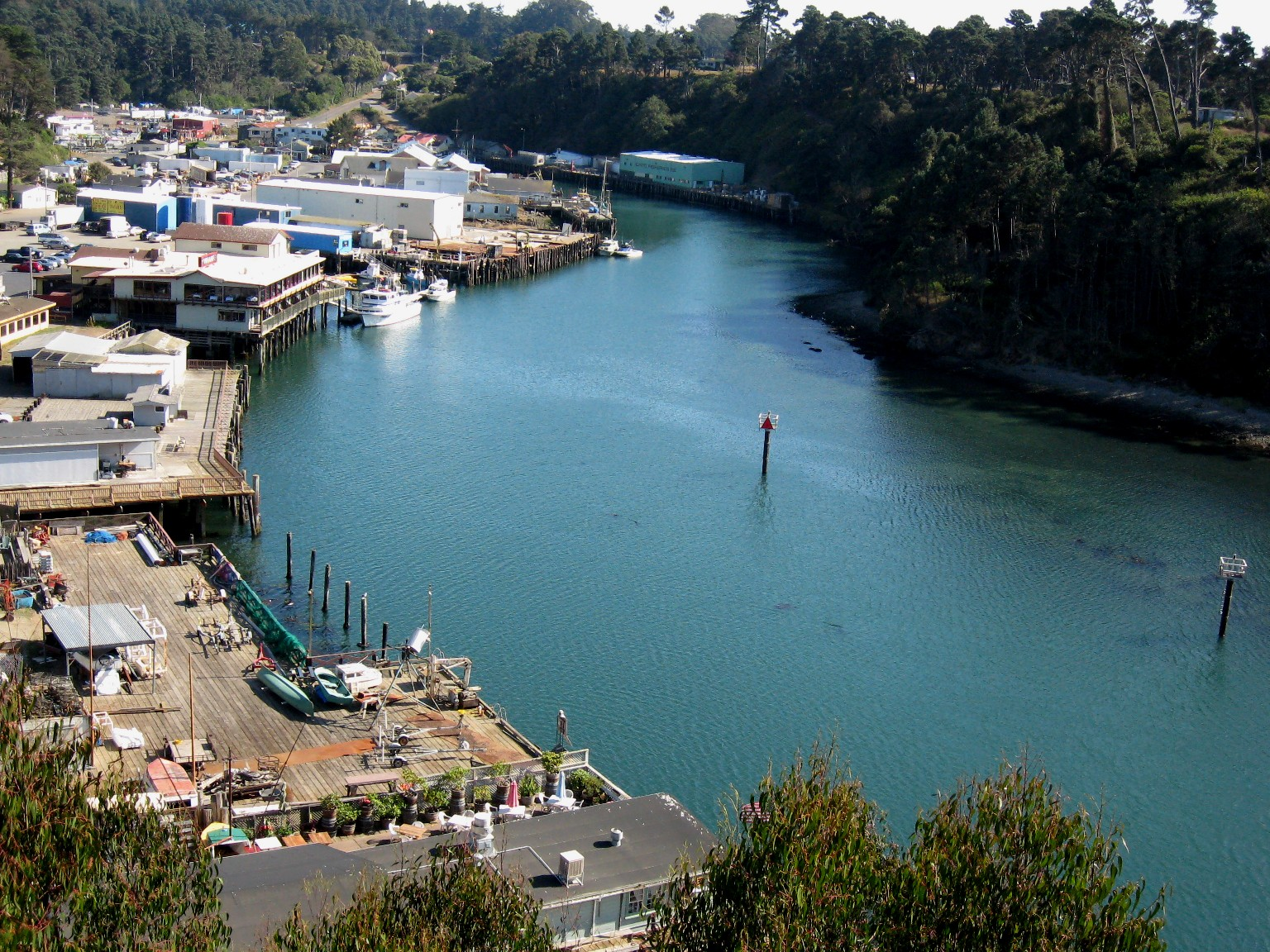
- Noyo Harbor in 2009

- Location in California
- Coordinates: 39°25′42″N 123°48′12″W
- Country: United States
- State: California
- County: Mendocino
- Elevation: 108 ft (33 m)

Noyo (formerly, "Noyo River") is an unincorporated community in Mendocino County, California, United States. It is located 1 mile (1.6 km) south of the center of Fort Bragg, at an elevation of 108 feet (33 m). It is named after the Noyo River, on which it lies; the Noyo River in turn was misnamed by white settlers to the Mendocino area after a village of the Pomo people named Noyo several miles north, on Pudding Creek. The Pomo named the creek after their village, and the settlers transferred the name to the larger river to the south.

The Noyo River post office operated from 1859 to 1860. The Noyo post office operated from 1872 to 1918. The city limits of Fort Bragg now come within a block of the edge of the bluff. The few houses outside the city limits, and the commercial buildings near the Noyo river are still known as "Noyo". The headlands near the mouth of the river on the south side (and shore of the river on the north side) are now part of the Pomo Bluffs city park, opened on April 22, 2006.

== In popular culture ==
The 1924 silent film drama The Signal Tower, a motion picture about the railroad, is set in Noyo. The 1980 horror film Humanoids from the Deep is set in Noyo.
