= Friona Independent School District =

Public school district based in Friona, Texas

Friona Independent School District is a public school district based in Friona, Texas (USA).

Located in Parmer County, a small portion of the district extends into Deaf Smith County.

In 2009, the school district was rated "academically acceptable" by the Texas Education Agency.

The district allowed black students to attend the same classes as white students before Brown v. Board of Education.

== Schools ==
- Friona High (Grades 9-12)
- Friona Junior High (Grades 6-8)
- Friona Elementary (Grades 2-5)
- Friona Primary (Grades PK-1)
