= My Name Is Bruce =

2007 American film directed by Bruce Campbell

- Theatrical release poster
- Directed by: Bruce Campbell
- Written by: Mark Verheiden
- Produced by: Bruce Campbell; Mike Richardson
- Starring: Bruce Campbell; Grace Thorsen; Taylor Sharpe; Ted Raimi; James Peck; Ellen Sandweiss; Ben McCain
- Cinematography: Kurt Rauf
- Edited by: M. Scott Smith
- Music by: Joseph LoDuca; Ben McCain; Butch McCain
- Production company: Dark Horse Entertainment
- Distributed by: Image Entertainment
- Release dates: April 13, 2007 (Ashland Independent Film Festival); October 26, 2008 (United States)
- Running time: 84 minutes
- Country: United States
- Language: English
- Budget: $1.5 million
- Box office: $173,066

My Name Is Bruce is a 2007 American comedy horror film directed, co-produced by, and starring B-movie cult actor Bruce Campbell. The film was written by Mark Verheiden. It had a theatrical release in October 2008, followed by DVD and Blu-ray releases on February 10, 2009.

Although Sam Raimi, with whom Bruce frequently collaborates, is not involved with this production, much of the film is in the vein of the Evil Dead series. Ted Raimi (Sam's brother), also a frequent collaborator, appears in this film.

Campbell has shown several minutes of the movie during some of his campus lectures, as well as a few public screenings, including showings at the sixth annual Ashland Independent Film Festival, CineVegas and the 11th annual East Lansing Film Festival. A trailer was released for the film, as well, and is available on various websites. A screening was held at the Alamo Drafthouse Cinema. Tickets for the show sold out in less than two minutes, breaking the previous Alamo ticket sellout record, which was also set by a Bruce Campbell appearance at the theater in 1998.

== Plot ==
In the mining town of Gold Lick, Oregon, Jeff, a young fan of B-movie actor Bruce Campbell, and his friend Clayton go out to a cemetery to meet two girls, Big Debbie and Little Debbie. Jeff removes a medallion off the mausoleum, unleashing the Chinese god of the dead, Guan Di, who kills Clayton and the Debbies while Jeff flees.

Meanwhile, Bruce Campbell is finishing filming for the fictional Cave Alien II, and is promised a birthday surprise from his agent, Mills Toddner. Bruce meets Jeff, who kidnaps Campbell and takes him to Gold Lick in hopes that his hero can save the town from Guan Di. Upon arrival, Bruce assumes this is his birthday surprise from Mills, and thinks it is all a movie, despite a lack of cameras and a script, and agrees to "help". He learns about Guan Di in the town's hall, and during a dinner party, Bruce gets on the good side of Jeff's mother, Kelly, who had initially been irritated by Bruce's behavior.

After gearing up at Gold Lick's gun shop, Bruce and many citizens of Gold Lick go out into the woods to take on Guan Di, which Bruce still thinks is part of a movie. Bruce then finds out that it is all real and flees Gold Lick, angering the townspeople, disappointing Kelly, and upsetting Jeff. As part of a running gag, an Italian painter constantly repaints the population sign every time someone dies, including himself. Bruce returns to his caravan to find that everyone, including his own dog, hates him a lot. He has a restraining order placed upon him by his ex-wife, Cheryl, and finds that his "surprise birthday present" from Mills was just a singing prostitute named Kasey. Bruce is then called by Jeff, who informs him that he is going to take on Guan Di alone in spite of Bruce's retreat.

Kasey takes Bruce back to Gold Lick, where he is treated with contempt and tries to reconcile with Kelly. To rescue Jeff, they both drive to the old cemetery, in which they set up dynamite at the mausoleum and try to lure Guan Di inside with one of Jeff's cardboard cut-outs of Bruce, for which Guan Di does not fall. After kissing Kelly, Bruce decides to sacrifice himself (with bean curd playing a significant role in luring Guan Di) and the dynamite is blown up. He emerges from the debris alive, and hangs the medallion back onto the mausoleum wall to ease the spirit. Guan Di then also comes back to life, and at the last minute, as revealed, the whole scenario was a movie. Bruce argues with Ted Raimi about the cliche ending and turns it into a happy ending, which involves Bruce and Kelly married, living in a nice house with their son, Jeff, who is accepted into Harvard University. After the movie ends, Bruce asks, "What could be a better ending than that?", after which Guan Di appears and attacks Bruce.

== Cast ==
- Bruce Campbell as Faux Bruce Campbell
- Ted Raimi as Mills Toddner / Wing / Ted the Sign Painter
- Ben McCain as the Mayor
- Ellen Sandweiss as Cheryl
- Dan Hicks as Dirt Farmer
- Butch McCain as the Sheriff/Farmer
- Grace Thorsen as Kelly Graham
- Taylor Sharpe as Jeff
- Timothy Patrick Quill as Frank
- Logan Martin as Clayton
- Ali Akay as Little Debbie
- Ariel Badenhop as Big Debbie
- Janelle Farber as Kasey
- James Peck as Guan-Di / Cavealien Monster
- Jen Brown as Petra
- Mike Estes as Fan #2
- Adam Boyd as "Tiny"

== Release ==
Over a year's gap occurred between the film's earliest screenings and its wider release in October 2008. Dark Horse Comics' Mike Richardson commented on this:

"'Some people maybe thought the film fell out or that there was something wrong with it,' Richardson says, touching on Bruce's slow journey getting before wide audiences. It was roughly a year ago that it screened to CineVegas film fest attendees. 'We did our shoot, put it in the can and the studio that financed it liked it so much they gave us more money to do a second shoot. We beefed it up so it could go into the theaters.'"

For the week of November 12, 2008, My Name is Bruce took in $18,777 from its showing at the Sunshine Theater in New York.

=== Reception ===
Reviews of My Name is Bruce were mixed. On the review aggregator website Rotten Tomatoes, 41% of 39 critics' reviews are positive, with an average rating of 6/10. The website's consensus reads: "My Name Is Bruce succeeds or fails based entirely upon the viewer's opinion of Bruce Campbell, an unreasonable burden for even the most accomplished actor." On Metacritic, the film has a score of 36 out of 100, based on 14 critics, indicating "generally unfavorable" reviews.

One positive review came from Nick Rogers of Suite101.com, saying, "My Name is Bruce won't give you sugar, baby. Not on its budget. But Splenda works fine as a substitute for this Kool-Aid, which Campbell knows fans will happily drink. A little bit of purposefully lousy filmmaking winds up going a long way." One negative review came from Felix Vasquez Jr. of Cinema Crazed, calling it "Smug, silly, and forgettable, this vanity project wants to be the next cult hit, but really is just another vehicle for Bruce Campbell."

=== Home media ===
The film was released on DVD and Blu-ray Disc on February 10, 2009.

== Proposed sequel ==
Richardson said that a sequel, titled My Name is Still Bruce, is in the works. Dark Horse Entertainment and Image Entertainment will distribute both films. The title for the second film has since been changed to Bruce vs. Frankenstein.

In a message sent in January 2010, to Ain't It Cool News, Campbell officially announced the sequel, stating that "principal photography begins this fall in Oregon." In April, Ted Raimi confirmed that he would be involved with the project. Campbell declared himself the director, saying, "no one will volunteer, so it's me."

== Adaptation ==
In September 2008, Dark Horse Comics published a single-issue comic-book adaptation of the movie. The script was adapted by Milton Freewater, Jr., and the art was by Cliff Richards.
