= Friona, Texas =

- City
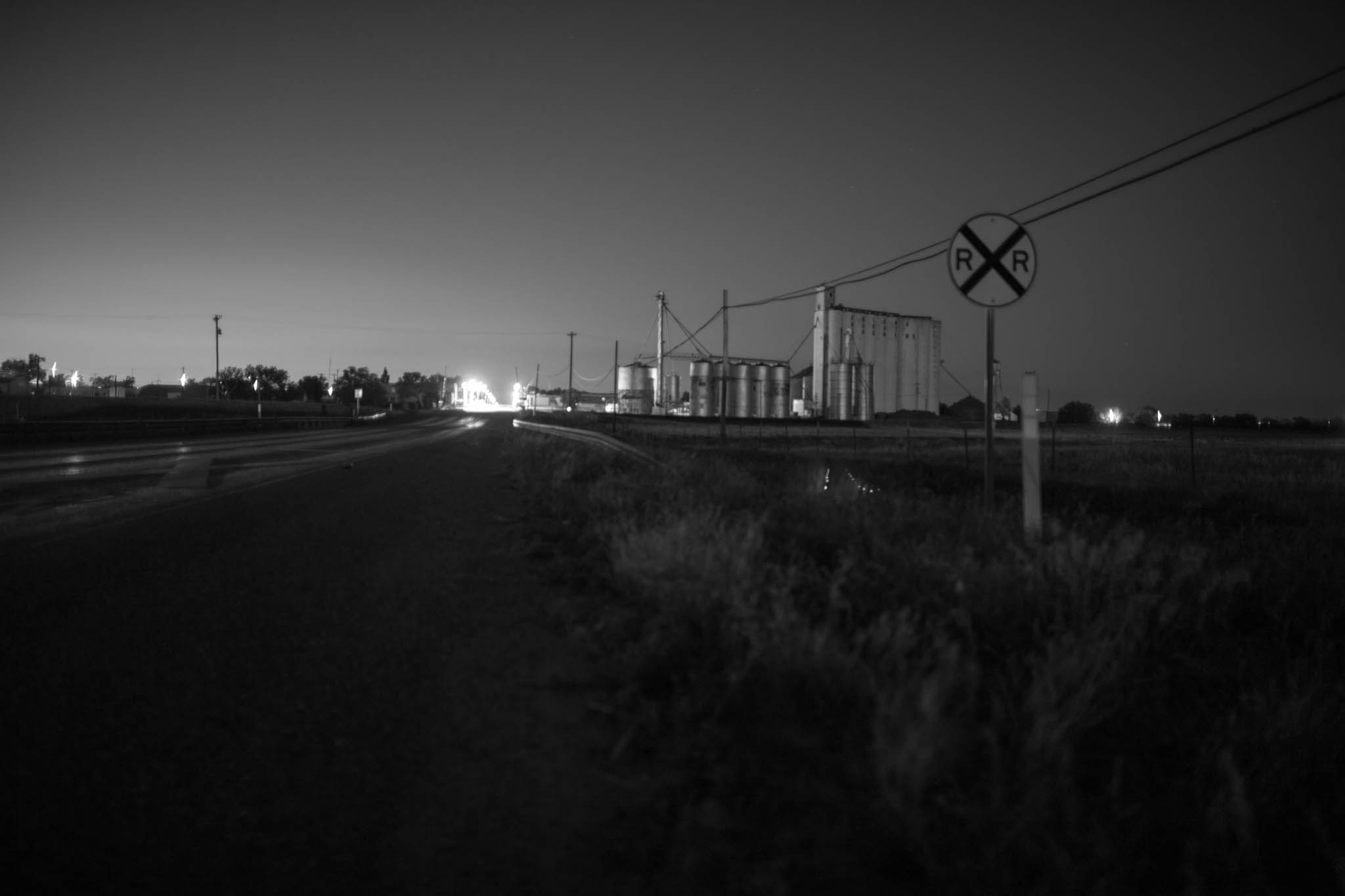
- Friona at dusk
- Motto: "The Biggest Small Town in Texas"
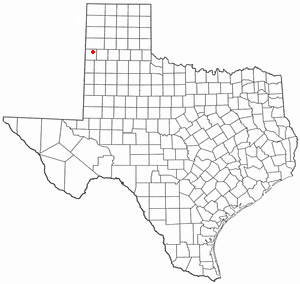
- Location of Friona, Texas

- Coordinates: 34°38′20″N 102°43′18″W
- Country: United States
- State: Texas
- County: Parmer

Government
  - Type: Council-manager
  - City Manager: Leander Davila

Area
  - Total: 1.40 sq mi (3.63 km^{2})
  - Land: 1.40 sq mi (3.63 km^{2})
  - Water: 0 sq mi (0.00 km^{2})
- Elevation: 4,019 ft (1,225 m)

Population (2020)
  - Total: 4,171
  - Density: 2,979.3/sq mi (1,150.31/km^{2})
- Time zone: UTC-6 (Central (CST))
  - Summer (DST): UTC-5 (CDT)
- ZIP code: 79035
- Area code: 806
- FIPS code: 48-27660
- GNIS feature ID: 1357767
- Website: www.cityoffriona.com

Friona is a city in Parmer County, Texas, United States. The population was 4,171 at the 2020 census. Friona was established as a small community in 1898 by XIT Ranch, originally called Frio, which is also the word for "cold" in Spanish.

The community served as a shipping point for the Pecos and Northern Texas Railroads. In 1906, the George G. Wright Land CO. chose the community for a colonization project, promising settlers of fertile soil, and a healthful climate. The community then became known as Friona after the opening of a post office in March 16, 1907 and started to construct various buildings, which were a hotel, livery stable and a bank. Soon after, the first church in Friona was constructed, and then in the following year of 1908 a school.

In 2007, the Texas State Legislature declared Friona the "Cheeseburger Capital of Texas". The city began holding the "Cheeseburger Cook-Off and Festival" in 2006.

The city motto is "The Biggest Small Town in Texas".

== Geography ==
Friona is located at 34°38′20″N 102°43′18″W (34.638987, –102.721571).

According to the United States Census Bureau, the city has a total area of 1.4 square miles (3.6 km^{2}), all land.

=== Climate ===
According to the Köppen climate classification, Friona has a semiarid climate, BSk on climate maps.

Climate data for Friona, Texas (1991–2020 normals, extremes 1962–present)
Month	Jan	Feb	Mar	Apr	May	Jun	Jul	Aug	Sep	Oct	Nov	Dec	Year
Record high °F (°C)	80 (27)	85 (29)	91 (33)	97 (36)	100 (38)	109 (43)	107 (42)	106 (41)	104 (40)	96 (36)	86 (30)	79 (26)	109 (43)
Mean maximum °F (°C)	69.9 (21.1)	74.9 (23.8)	82.3 (27.9)	87.1 (30.6)	94.0 (34.4)	100.1 (37.8)	100.0 (37.8)	98.1 (36.7)	95.2 (35.1)	88.8 (31.6)	78.7 (25.9)	70.2 (21.2)	102.7 (39.3)
Mean daily maximum °F (°C)	50.9 (10.5)	56.0 (13.3)	64.3 (17.9)	72.0 (22.2)	80.3 (26.8)	89.4 (31.9)	91.2 (32.9)	89.9 (32.2)	83.5 (28.6)	73.0 (22.8)	60.3 (15.7)	51.0 (10.6)	71.8 (22.1)
Daily mean °F (°C)	36.7 (2.6)	40.5 (4.7)	48.0 (8.9)	55.2 (12.9)	64.7 (18.2)	74.3 (23.5)	77.3 (25.2)	76.0 (24.4)	69.1 (20.6)	57.7 (14.3)	45.4 (7.4)	37.3 (2.9)	56.9 (13.8)
Mean daily minimum °F (°C)	22.4 (−5.3)	25.1 (−3.8)	31.7 (−0.2)	38.4 (3.6)	49.0 (9.4)	59.2 (15.1)	63.4 (17.4)	62.1 (16.7)	54.6 (12.6)	42.3 (5.7)	30.5 (−0.8)	23.6 (−4.7)	41.9 (5.5)
Mean minimum °F (°C)	9.5 (−12.5)	11.0 (−11.7)	17.1 (−8.3)	26.3 (−3.2)	36.1 (2.3)	50.0 (10.0)	57.8 (14.3)	56.0 (13.3)	43.4 (6.3)	27.9 (−2.3)	16.2 (−8.8)	8.3 (−13.2)	4.2 (−15.4)
Record low °F (°C)	−15 (−26)	−13 (−25)	5 (−15)	16 (−9)	24 (−4)	42 (6)	51 (11)	47 (8)	29 (−2)	13 (−11)	2 (−17)	−9 (−23)	−15 (−26)
Average precipitation inches (mm)	0.70 (18)	0.48 (12)	1.15 (29)	1.00 (25)	2.14 (54)	2.49 (63)	2.64 (67)	3.13 (80)	2.03 (52)	1.98 (50)	0.75 (19)	0.80 (20)	19.29 (490)
Average snowfall inches (cm)	2.5 (6.4)	2.4 (6.1)	1.4 (3.6)	0.5 (1.3)	0.0 (0.0)	0.0 (0.0)	0.0 (0.0)	0.0 (0.0)	0.0 (0.0)	0.6 (1.5)	1.9 (4.8)	3.7 (9.4)	13.0 (33)
Average precipitation days (≥ 0.01 in)	3.2	3.3	4.2	4.4	6.3	7.1	6.5	8.2	5.4	5.2	3.1	3.7	60.6
Average snowy days (≥ 0.1 in)	1.6	1.4	0.8	0.2	0.0	0.0	0.0	0.0	0.0	0.3	0.9	1.6	6.8
Source: NOAA

== Demographics ==
Historical population
Census	Pop.	Note	%±
1930	731		—
1940	803		9.8%
1950	1,202		49.7%
1960	2,048		70.4%
1970	3,111		51.9%
1980	3,809		22.4%
1990	3,688		−3.2%
2000	3,854		4.5%
2010	4,123		7.0%
2020	4,171		1.2%
U.S. Decennial Census

=== 2020 census ===
As of the 2020 census, Friona had a population of 4,171, 1,340 households, and 1,084 families. The median age was 30.9 years. 30.4% of residents were under the age of 18 and 12.3% of residents were 65 years of age or older. For every 100 females there were 105.6 males, and for every 100 females age 18 and over there were 102.4 males age 18 and over.

0.0% of residents lived in urban areas, while 100.0% lived in rural areas.

There were 1,340 households in Friona, of which 40.9% had children under the age of 18 living in them. Of all households, 55.1% were married-couple households, 19.4% were households with a male householder and no spouse or partner present, and 21.2% were households with a female householder and no spouse or partner present. About 20.2% of all households were made up of individuals and 8.9% had someone living alone who was 65 years of age or older.

There were 1,439 housing units, of which 6.9% were vacant. The homeowner vacancy rate was 1.4% and the rental vacancy rate was 6.4%.

Racial composition as of the 2020 census
Race	Number	Percent
White	1,677	40.2%
Black or African American	41	1.0%
American Indian and Alaska Native	94	2.3%
Asian	10	0.2%
Native Hawaiian and Other Pacific Islander	2	0.0%
Some other race	1,369	32.8%
Two or more races	978	23.4%
Hispanic or Latino (of any race)	3,372	80.8%

=== 2010 census ===
As of the 2010 United States census, 4,123 people were living in the city. The racial makeup of the city was 69.9% Hispanic, 28.2% White, 0.9% Black, 0.3% Native American, 0.2% Asian, 0.2% Pacific Islander, and 0.3% from two or more races.

=== 2000 census ===
As of the census of 2000, 3,854 people, 1,271 households, and 983 families resided in the city. The population density was 2,794.8 inhabitants per square mile (1,079.1/km^{2}). The 1,399 housing units averaged 1,014.5 per square mile (391.4/km^{2}). The racial makeup of the city was 61.47% White, 1.30% African American, 0.75% Native American, 0.39% Asian, 33.81% from other races, and 2.28% from two or more races. Hispanics or Latinos of any race were 57.86% of the population.

Of the 1,271 households, 44.4% had children under the age of 18 living with them, 64.4% were married couples living together, 10.0% had a female householder with no husband present, and 22.6% were not families. About 20.1% of all households were made up of individuals, and 10.6% had someone living alone who was 65 years of age or older. The average household size was 2.97 and the average family size was 3.48.

In the city, the population was distributed as 33.2% under the age of 18, 8.6% from 18 to 24, 26.8% from 25 to 44, 18.8% from 45 to 64, and 12.6% 65 years of age or older. The median age was 31 years. For every 100 females, there were 94.8 males. For every 100 females age 18 and over, there were 91.5 males.

The median income for a household in the city was $31,964, and for a family was $36,863. Males had a median income of $29,375 versus $19,299 for females. The per capita income for the city was $13,635. About 14.1% of families and 15.5% of the population were below the poverty line, including 17.5% of those under age 18 and 14.3% of those age 65 or over.

== Education ==
In 1954, following Brown v. Board Of Education, Friona was the first school in Texas to integrate black students.

The city is served by Friona Independent School District. The local high school mascot is a Chieftain. The school colors are red and white. The girls' team mascot is a Squaw. The junior high boys' team mascot is a Brave. The junior high girls' team mascot is a Maiden.
