= Outside Ozona =

- Directed by: J. S. Cardone
- Written by: J. S. Cardone
- Produced by: Scott Einbinder; Carol Kottenbrook
- Starring: Robert Forster; Kevin Pollak; Sherilyn Fenn; David Paymer; Penelope Ann Miller; Swoosie Kurtz; Taj Mahal; Meat Loaf
- Cinematography: Irek Hartowicz
- Edited by: Amanda I. Kirpaul
- Music by: Taj Mahal; Johnny Lee Schell
- Distributed by: TriStar Pictures
- Release date: December 18, 1998
- Running time: 100 minutes
- Country: United States
- Language: English

Outside Ozona is a 1998 American comedy-drama film written and directed by J. S. Cardone. The film follows a group of strangers who are all listening to the same radio station.

== Plot ==
Despite the disapproval of his radio manager, a disc jockey chooses to play the blues instead of their regular country music. While he is doing so, different listeners tune in. Each of them have various personal problems. Unbeknownst to them all, each will be crossing the path of a serial killer as they near the town of Ozona.

== Cast ==
- Robert Forster.....Odell Parks
- Kevin Pollak.....Wit Roy
- Sherilyn Fenn.....Marcy Duggan Rice
- David Paymer.....Alan Defaux
- Penelope Ann Miller.....Earlene Demers
- Swoosie Kurtz.....Rosalee
- Taj Mahal.....Dix Mayal
- Meat Loaf.....Floyd Bibbs
- Lucy Webb.....Agent Ellen Deene
- Lois Red Elk.....Effie Twosalt
- Kateri Walker.....Reba Twosalt
