= Bovina Independent School District =

School district in Texas

Location
- 500 Halsell St. Bovina, Texas ESC Region 16 United States
- Coordinates: 34°30′51″N 102°53′22″W

District information
- Type: Independent school district
- Grades: Pre-K through 12
- Superintendent: Dale Fullerton
- Schools: 3 (2009-10)
- NCES District ID: 4810950

Students and staff
- Students: 506 (2010-11)
- Teachers: 49.28 (2009-10) (on full-time equivalent (FTE) basis)
- Student–teacher ratio: 10.45 (2009-10)
- Athletic conference: UIL Class 2A Football Division II
- District mascot: Mustang
- Colors: Maroon and White

Other information
- TEA District Accountability Rating for 2011-12: Academically Acceptable
- Website: Bovina ISD

Bovina Independent School District is a public school district based in Bovina, Texas, United States. The district operates one high school, Bovina High School.

== Finances ==
As of the 2010–2011 school year, the appraised valuation of property in the district was $70,499,000. The maintenance tax rate was $0.102 and the bond tax rate was $0.000 per $100 of appraised valuation.

== Academic achievement ==
In 2011, the school district was rated "academically acceptable" by the Texas Education Agency. 49% of districts in Texas in 2011 received the same rating. No state accountability ratings will be given to districts in 2012. A school district in Texas can receive one of four possible rankings from the Texas Education Agency: Exemplary (the highest possible ranking), Recognized, Academically Acceptable, and Academically Unacceptable (the lowest possible ranking).

Historical district TEA accountability ratings

- 2011: Academically Acceptable
- 2010: Recognized
- 2009: Academically Acceptable
- 2008: Academically Acceptable
- 2007: Academically Acceptable
- 2006: Academically Acceptable
- 2005: Academically Acceptable
- 2004: Academically Acceptable

== Schools ==
In the 2011–2012 school year, the district operated three campuses.

- Bovina High (grades 9-12)
- Bovina Middle (grades 6-8)
- Bovina Elementary (grades PK-5)

== Athletics ==
Bovina High School participates in the boys' sports of basketball, cross country, golf, track and football and the girls' sports of cross country, basketball, track and golf. For the 2012 through 2014 school years, Bovina High School played football in UIL Class 1A Division II.

== Controversy ==
In July 2024, the ACLU of Texas sent Bovina Independent School District a letter, alleging that the district's 2023-2024 dress and grooming code appeared to violate the Texas Creating a Respectful and Open World for Natural Hair (or CROWN) Act, which prohibits racial discrimination based on hairstyles or hair texture, and asking the district to revise its policies for the 2024-2025 school year.

== See also ==
- List of school districts in Texas
- List of high schools in Texas
