= Bovina, Texas =

- City
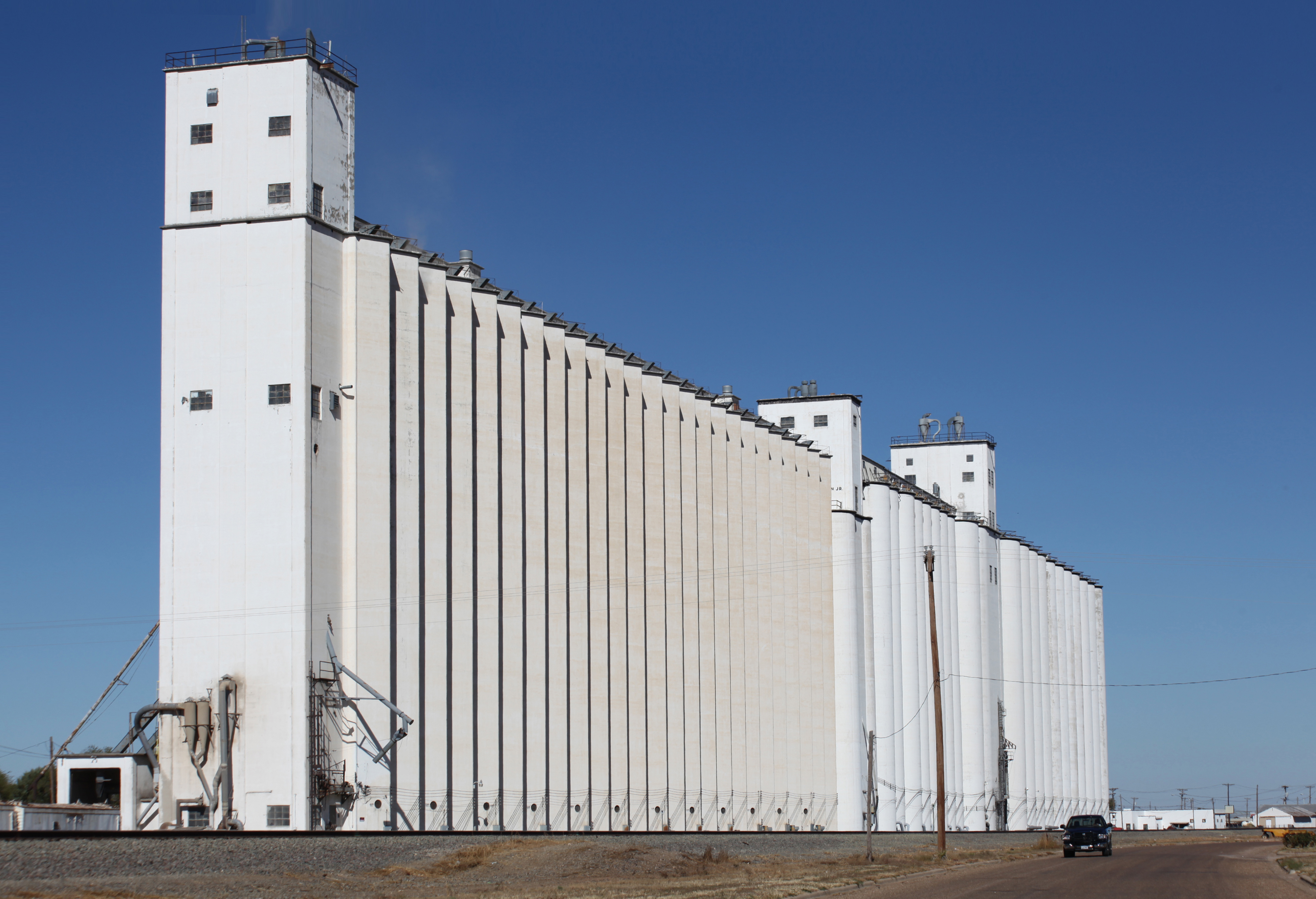
- Grain Elevator in Bovina
- Interactive map of Bovina, Texas
- Location within Texas
- Coordinates: 34°30′49″N 102°52′59″W
- Country: United States
- State: Texas
- County: Parmer
- Region: Llano Estacado
- Established: 1899

Area
  - Total: 1.18 sq mi (3.05 km^{2})
  - Land: 1.18 sq mi (3.05 km^{2})
  - Water: 0 sq mi (0.00 km^{2})
- Elevation: 4,068 ft (1,240 m)

Population (2020)
  - Total: 1,699
  - Density: 1,508.3/sq mi (582.36/km^{2})
- Time zone: UTC-6 (CST)
  - Summer (DST): UTC-5 (CDT)
- ZIP code: 79009
- Area code: 806
- FIPS code: 48-09628
- Website: www.cityofbovina.net

Bovina is a city in Parmer County, Texas, United States. As of the 2020 census, Bovina had a population of 1,699.

== History ==
Originally, the community was the Hay Hook Line Camp of the XIT Ranch, and the ranch headquarters was one of the county's earliest buildings. When the Pecos and Northern Texas Railway was built through the ranch in 1898, a switch was placed at the site to be used by cowboys to unload cottonseed shipped in as feed. Some of this feed was invariably spilled along the tracks, causing XIT cattle to gather at the unfenced right-of-way. Often, they lay down, compelling railroad workers to get off their trains and prod them off the tracks. As a result, the site was labeled Bull Town, a name replaced by the more elegant Bovina when the post office was established on January 31, 1899.

== Geography ==
Bovina is located at 34°30′49″N 102°52′59″W.

According to the United States Census Bureau, the city has a total area of 0.9 square miles (2.3 km^{2}), all land.

== Demographics ==
Historical population
Census	Pop.	Note	%±
1950	612		—
1960	1,029		68.1%
1970	1,428		38.8%
1980	1,499		5.0%
1990	1,549		3.3%
2000	1,874		21.0%
2010	1,868		−0.3%
2020	1,699		−9.0%
U.S. Decennial Census

=== 2020 census ===
Racial composition as of the 2020 census
Race	Percent
White	46.1%
Black or African American	1.1%
American Indian and Alaska Native	1.6%
Asian	0%
Native Hawaiian and Other Pacific Islander	0%
Some other race	26.8%
Two or more races	24.4%
Hispanic or Latino (of any race)	85.9%

As of the 2020 census, Bovina had a population of 1,699, a median age of 32.9 years, 31.5% of residents under the age of 18, and 12.3% of residents 65 years of age or older; for every 100 females there were 105.4 males and for every 100 females age 18 and over there were 106.2 males age 18 and over.

The 2020 census counted 554 households, 282 of which were families; 46.9% of all households had children under the age of 18, 56.1% were married-couple households, 17.9% were households with a male householder and no spouse or partner present, 21.5% were households with a female householder and no spouse or partner present, 17.7% were composed of individuals, and 5.8% had someone living alone who was 65 years of age or older.

There were 626 housing units, of which 11.5% were vacant; 64.3% of the occupied units were owner-occupied and 35.7% were renter-occupied, with a homeowner vacancy rate of 0.6% and a rental vacancy rate of 8.3%.

0% of residents lived in urban areas, while 100.0% lived in rural areas.

=== 2010 census ===
As of the 2010 United States census, there were 1,868 people living in the city. The racial makeup of the city was 82.3% Hispanic or Latino, 16.6% White, 0.7% Black, 0.1% Native American, 0.1% Asian, 0.1% Pacific Islander, 0.1% from some other race and 0.1% from two or more races.

=== 2000 census ===
As of the census of 2000, 1,874 people, 567 households, and 467 families resided in the city. The population density was 2,161.0 inhabitants per square mile (834.4/km^{2}). The 612 housing units averaged 705.7 per square mile (271.6/km^{2}). The racial makeup of the city was 48.67% White, 1.23% African American, 0.69% Native American, 0.21% Pacific Islander, 46.32% from other races, and 2.88% from two or more races. Hispanics or Latinos of any race were 72.20% of the population.

Of the 567 households, 51.5% had children under the age of 18 living with them, 67.0% were married couples living together, 11.5% had a female householder with no husband present, and 17.6% were not families. About 16.4% of all households were made up of individuals, and 9.5% had someone living alone who was 65 years of age or older. The average household size was 3.31 and the average family size was 3.72.

In the city, the population was distributed as 37.6% under the age of 18, 9.5% from 18 to 24, 27.9% from 25 to 44, 16.2% from 45 to 64, and 8.8% who were 65 years of age or older. The median age was 28 years. For every 100 females, there were 101.1 males. For every 100 females age 18 and over, there were 93.5 males.

The median income for a household in the city was $27,426, and for a family was $29,602. Males had a median income of $25,417 versus $18,036 for females. The per capita income for the city was $10,995. About 16.8% of families and 20.8% of the population were below the poverty line, including 24.0% of those under age 18 and 17.3% of those age 65 or over.

== Government ==
In 1976, Bovina adopted the city manager form of government, with Larry D. Gilley first filling the position. Gilley later became the manager in Abilene and San Marcos, Texas. The last city manager was Ernest Terry, who served from 2001 to 2007. Terry later became the manager in Fritch, Texas. Currently filling the position as city manager is Cesar Marquez.

== Notable people ==
- Ben McCain, actor
- Butch McCain actor (brother of Ben), grew up in Bovina

== Education ==
The City of Bovina is served by the Bovina Independent School District.

The high school's mascot is the Mustang. Its colors are maroon and white. Bovina's rivals are Farwell and Friona.

== See also ==
- Llano Estacado
- West Texas
- Running Water Draw
- XIT Ranch
- Blackwater Draw
- List of ghost towns in Texas
