= Humanoids from the Deep =

1980 film by Barbara Peeters

- Theatrical release poster
- Directed by: Barbara Peeters; Jimmy T. Murakami (uncredited)
- Screenplay by: Frederick James
- Story by: Frank Arnold; Martin B. Cohen
- Produced by: Martin B. Cohen
- Starring: Doug McClure; Ann Turkel; Vic Morrow; Lynn Schiller
- Cinematography: Daniel Lacambre
- Edited by: Mark Goldblatt
- Music by: James Horner
- Distributed by: New World Pictures (United States); United Artists (International)
- Release date: May 16, 1980
- Running time: 80 minutes
- Country: United States
- Language: English
- Budget: $2.5 million
- Box office: $2.1 million

Humanoids from the Deep (released as Monster in Europe and Japan) is a 1980 American science fiction horror film starring Doug McClure, Ann Turkel, and Vic Morrow. Roger Corman served as the film's uncredited executive producer, and his company, New World Pictures, distributed it. Humanoids from the Deep was directed by Barbara Peeters and an uncredited Jimmy T. Murakami. It was the last feature film directed by Peeters.

== Plot ==
Anglers from the fishing village of Noyo, California, catch what appears to be a monster. The young son of one of the anglers falls into the water and something unseen drags him under the surface. Another angler prepares a flare gun, but he slips and accidentally fires it into the deck, which is soaked with gasoline dropped earlier by the boy. The vessel bursts into flames and explodes; everybody aboard is killed. Jim Hill and his wife Carol witness the explosion. Later, their dog goes missing and the couple finds its dismembered corpse on the nearby beach.

The following day, teenagers Jerry Potter and Peggy Larson go for a swim at the beach. Jerry is abruptly pulled under the water. Peggy believes it is a prank until she discovers his mutilated corpse. Peggy screams and tries to reach the beach, but a monstrous figure drags her across the sand. The humanoid creature tears off her bikini and rapes her.

That night, two other teenagers are camping on the same beach. Billy is about to have sex with his girlfriend Becky, when another humanoid monster claws its way inside, kills him, and chases Becky onto the beach. She escapes her assailant, only to run into the arms of yet another monster, which throws her to the sand and rapes her. More attacks follow; not all of them successful. But few witnesses survive to tell the public about the incidents; only Peggy is found alive, though severely traumatized. Jim's brother is also attacked, prompting Jim to take a personal interest in the matter.

A company called Canco has announced plans to build a huge cannery near Noyo. The murderous, sex-hungry mutations are apparently the result of Canco's experiments with a growth hormone they had earlier administered to salmon. The salmon escaped from Canco's laboratory into the ocean during a storm and were eaten by large fish that then mutated into the brutal, depraved humanoids that have begun to terrorize the village.

By the time Jim and Canco scientist Dr. Susan Drake have deduced what is occurring, the village's annual festival has begun. At the festival, many humanoids appear, murdering the men and raping every woman they can grab. Jim devises a plan to stop the humanoids by pumping gasoline into the bay and setting it on fire, cutting off the humanoids' way of retreat. Meanwhile, Carol is attacked at home by two of the creatures, but manages to kill them before Jim arrives.

The morning after the festival, peace seems to have returned to the village. Jim asks the sheriff about Dr. Drake. The sheriff mumbles that she went back to the lab, where she is coaching a pregnant Peggy, who has survived her sexual assault. Peggy is about to give birth when her monstrous offspring bursts from her womb, with Peggy screaming at the screeching baby.

== Cast ==
- Doug McClure as Jim Hill
- Ann Turkel as Dr. Susan Drake
- Vic Morrow as Hank Slattery
- Cindy Weintraub as Carol Hill
- Anthony Pena as Johnny Eagle
- Denise Galik as Linda Beale
- Lynn Schiller as Peggy Larson
- Meegan King as Jerry Potter
- Breck Costin as Tommy Hill
- Hoke Howell as Deke Jensen
- Don Maxwell as Dickie Moore
- David Strassman as Billy
- Lisa Glaser as Becky
- Julie Kestel as Seaweed Hag
- Greg Travis as Mike Michaels, Radio Announcer
- Linda Shayne as Sally, Miss Salmon
- Bruce Monette as Jake Potter
- Shawn Erler as Shawn Hill

== Production ==
The film was originally written under the title Humanoids from the Deep. The idea was to update old monster movies like The Creature from the Black Lagoon to reflect modern day concerns like pollution. The script was sold to New World who filmed it as Beneath the Darkness.

The job of directing Humanoids from the Deep was originally offered to Joe Dante, who had just made Piranha; he turned the film down feeling it was too close to Piranha. Barbara Peeters, who had worked in a variety of capacities for New World throughout the 1970s, accepted the assignment. She was recovering from an illness and was unable to find other work. (Peeters had just joined the Directors Guild of America. As New World was not a signatory to the DGA, Peeters was fined $15,000 for making the film.)

Shooting commenced in October 1979. Primary filming took place in the California towns of Mendocino, Fort Bragg, and Noyo.

Portions of the film were directed by an uncredited Murakami, who directed the Corman-produced sci-fi cult classic Battle Beyond the Stars the same year.

The film's budget was reportedly $2.5 million. The monster costumes were designed and created by Rob Bottin. Gale Anne Hurd was a production assistant. Ann Turkel, the female lead, said "It was a good quality film and the footage was beautiful. The actors were all excellent."

=== Reshoots ===
Executive producer Corman felt Peeters' version of the film lacked the exploitative elements needed to satisfy its intended audience. In an interview included on the 2010 Blu-ray release by Shout! Factory, Corman said he conveyed to Peeters his expectations of B-movie exploitation, encapsulated by the phrase that the monsters "kill all the men and rape all the women". In post-production, Corman said Peeters had done an outstanding job in filming the death scenes involving male characters, but all of the rape scenes had been left "shadowy" or used cutaways before the attacks occurred.

Second unit director James Sbardellati, who later directed Deathstalker, was hired to enliven the film; he filmed explicit scenes in which the humanoids rape women. These changes were not communicated to most of the people who had made the film with the working title Beneath the Darkness. Several of them expressed shock and anger at the released film, its changed title, and the nudity and sexual exploitation.

According to a journalist from the Los Angeles Times who attended the screening:

I looked at the faces of the women crew-members. They’d been elated and warm before the screening, but now they were mostly staring at the floor. Some had angry, disgusted looks on their faces. That’s a look I see more and more on women these days. I call it the desperado look. More than anger, more than bitterness, more than the fight-back warning of people beyond being charmed or cajoled, it’s a look of betrayal. All these women looked, one way or another, as though they could write the book on betrayal.

"I never made a film about women being sexually ravaged by monsters," said Peeters who added the film is "offensive to me and all the women who worked on it." Peeters said, "I'm not opposed to shooting nudity... but only when it was integrated into the story. I've never shot rape or violence towards women or things that would be mean or degrading... I'm goddam mad." Turkel said the new sequences "were like out of a bad porn movie." Peeters and Turkel subsequently asked for their names to be removed from the film, but were refused. Turkel castigated Corman for his actions on television talk shows. She also unsuccessfully petitioned the Screen Actors Guild to halt the Humanoids from the Deep's release, on the grounds that it bore no resemblance to the film she was hired to make.

== Soundtrack ==
The score of the film was the second to be composed by James Horner.

Humanoids from the Deep: Original Motion Picture Soundtrack (1981, BSX Records)
No.	Title	Length
1.	"Main Title"	2:23
2.	"The 'Buck-O'"	3:40
3.	"Unwelcome Visitor"	2:02
4.	"Night Swim"	1:47
5.	"Jerry and Peggy"	0:53
6.	"Trip Upriver"	1:56
7.	"The Humanoids Attack"	2:49
8.	"Jerry's Death"	2:02
9.	"Search for Clues"	1:52
10.	"Strange Catch"	1:02
11.	"The Grotto"	3:16
12.	"Night Prowlers"	2:03
13.	"Final Confrontation"	3:01
14.	"Aftermath and New Birth"	2:18
15.	"End Titles"	2:10
Total length:		33:14

== Reception ==
=== Box office ===
Humanoids from the Deep was a modest financial success for New World Pictures. By May 1980 it had earned rentals of $1.3 million. It went on to earn $2.5 million more.

=== Critical response ===
Critical reviews were mostly negative. The Los Angeles Times praised "Peeters' real flair for capturing small town folk without condescension" and the "interesting, stylised, liquid cinematography" but called the movie "a mangled monster horror" with "no consistency of tone." Paul Taylor said in Time Out, "Despite the sex of the director, a more blatant endorsement of exploitation cinema's current anti-women slant would be hard to find; Peeters also lies on the gore pretty thick amid the usual visceral drive-in hooks and rip-offs from genre hits; and with the humor of an offering like Piranha entirely absent, this turns out to be a nasty piece of work all round".

Briefly discussing the film in Fangoria, Alien writer Dan O'Bannon criticized the film, saying, "Roger Corman's people ripped off the chestburster idea for Humanoids of the Deep." Phil Hardy's The Aurum Film Encyclopedia: Horror stated that additional sex and violence scenes had been edited into the film without director Peeter's knowledge. Hardy continued, "As weighed down as it is with solemn musings about ecology and dispossessed Indians, it looks as if it had always been a hopeless case". Film critic Leonard Maltin gave the film 3 out of a possible 4 stars, calling it "fast, occasionally hilarious gutter trash from the Roger Corman stable".

Nathaniel Thompson said on his Mondo Digital website, "Director Peeters claimed that Roger Corman added some of the more explicit shots of slimy nudity at the last minute to give the film some extra kick, but frankly, the movie needed it. Though competently handled, the lack of visual style, occasionally slow pacing, and peculiar lack of (intentional) humor hinder this from becoming an all-out trash masterpiece". In his Psychotronic Encyclopedia of Film, Michael Weldon said, "Many were offended by the rape aspect of this fast-paced thriller featuring lots of Creature from the Black Lagoon-inspired monsters. Like it or not, it was a hit and is not dull".

On Rotten Tomatoes, the film has a 50% based on 12 reviews, with an average rating of 5.4 out of 10. Metacritic, which uses a weighted average, assigned the film a score of 49 out of 100, based on 6 critics, indicating "mixed or average" reviews.

In 2019 Barbara Peeters said "I don't talk about that film".

== Aftermath ==
A sequel starring Malcolm McDowell was announced but never made. However, in 1996 the Humanoids from the Deep remake was produced for Showtime by Corman's production company, Concorde-New Horizons. It starred Robert Carradine, Emma Samms, Justin Walker, Mark Rolston, Danielle Weeks and Clint Howard. It was released on DVD in 2003.

In 2010, Shout! Factory released a 30th Anniversary Special Edition DVD and Blu-ray of the original Humanoids from the Deep. It contained a new anamorphic widescreen transfer of the film, as well as interviews and a collectible booklet. In this edition, the film's on-screen title is Monster, and thus screens the uncut European version.

== Bibliography ==
- Epstein, Andrew (May 8, 1980). "'Humanoids' haywire, women say". Los Angeles Times. pp. 4–6 Part 6.
- Jankiewicz, Pat. "Revenge of the Noids". Fangoria. pp. 38–40.
- Koetting, Christopher T. (2009). Mind Warp!: The Fantastic True Story of Roger Corman's New World Pictures. Hemlock Books. ISBN 978-0955777417.
