= Parmer County, Texas =

County in Texas, United States

- County
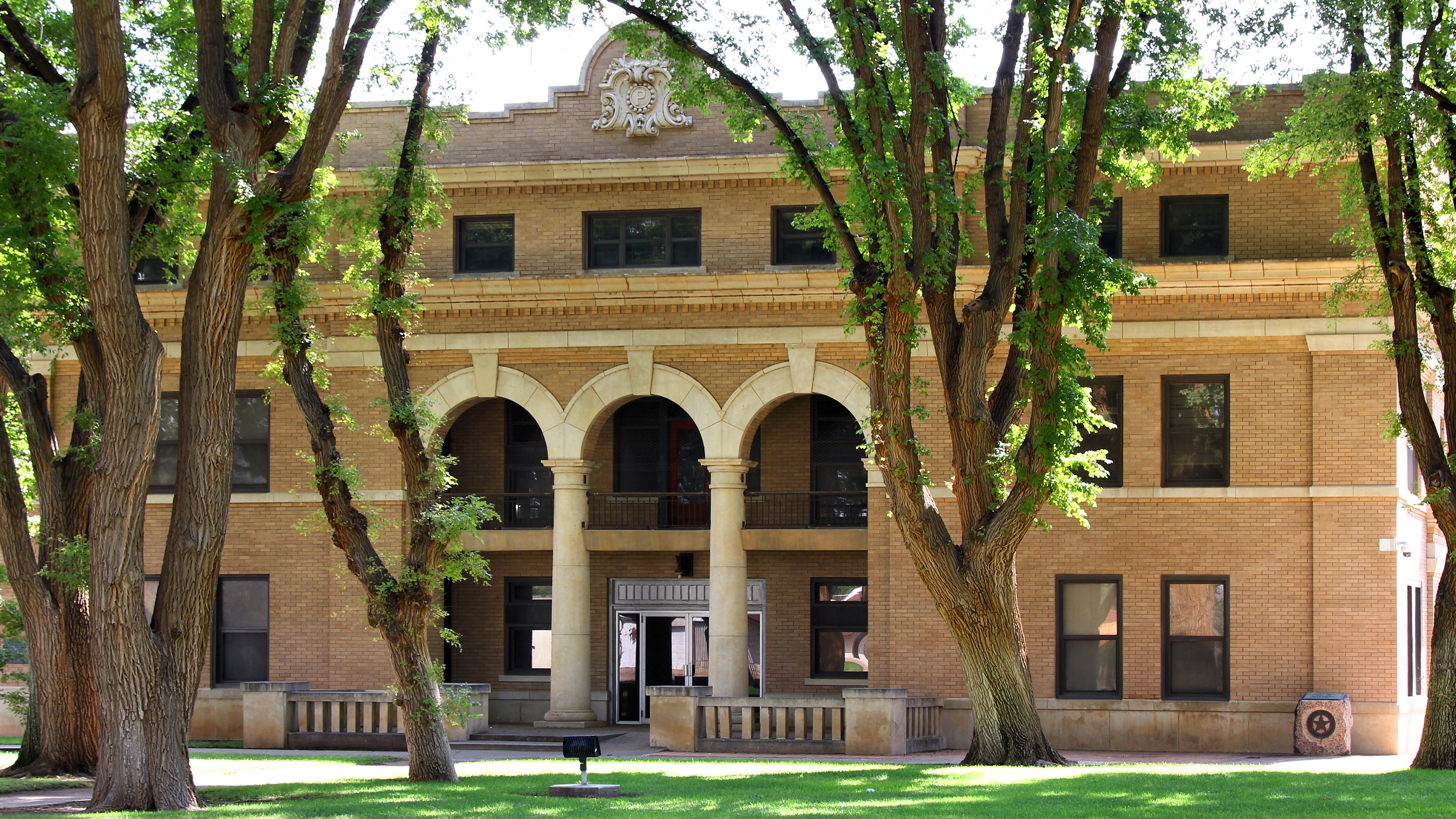
- The Parmer County Courthouse in Farwell

- Location within the U.S. state of Texas
- Coordinates: 34°32′N 102°47′W
- Country: United States
- State: Texas
- Founded: 1907
- Named for: Martin Parmer
- Seat: Farwell
- Largest city: Friona

Area
  - Total: 885 sq mi (2,290 km^{2})
  - Land: 881 sq mi (2,280 km^{2})
  - Water: 4.4 sq mi (11 km^{2}) 0.5%

Population (2020)
  - Total: 9,869
  - Estimate (2025): 9,678 ▼
  - Density: 11/sq mi (4.2/km^{2})
- Time zone: UTC−6 (Central)
  - Summer (DST): UTC−5 (CDT)
- Congressional district: 19th
- Website: parmercounty.texas.gov

Parmer County is a county located in the southwestern Texas Panhandle on the High Plains of the Llano Estacado in the U.S. state of Texas. As of the 2020 Census, the population was 9,869. The county seat is Farwell. The county was created in 1876 and later organized in 1907. It is named in honor of Martin Parmer, a signer of the Texas Declaration of Independence and early judge. Parmer County was one of 10 prohibition, or entirely dry, counties in the state of Texas, but is now a wet county.

== Geography ==
According to the U.S. Census Bureau, the county has a total area of 885 square miles (2,290 km^{2}), of which 881 square miles (2,280 km^{2}) are land and 4.4 square miles (11 km^{2}) (0.5%) are covered by water.

=== Major highways ===
- U.S. Highway 60
- U.S. Highway 70
- U.S. Highway 84
- State Highway 86
- State Highway 214
- Loop 403

=== Adjacent counties ===
- Deaf Smith County (north)
- Castro County (east)
- Lamb County (southeast)
- Bailey County (south)
- Curry County, New Mexico (west/Mountain Time Zone)

== Demographics ==
Historical population
Census	Pop.	Note	%±
1890	7		—
1900	34		385.7%
1910	1,555		4,473.5%
1920	1,699		9.3%
1930	5,869		245.4%
1940	5,890		0.4%
1950	5,787		−1.7%
1960	9,583		65.6%
1970	10,509		9.7%
1980	11,038		5.0%
1990	9,863		−10.6%
2000	10,016		1.6%
2010	10,269		2.5%
2020	9,869		−3.9%
2025 (est.)	9,678	▼	−1.9%
U.S. Decennial Census; 1850–2010 2010 2020

=== 2020 census ===
As of the 2020 census, the county had a population of 9,869. The median age was 34.0 years. 28.8% of residents were under the age of 18 and 14.6% of residents were 65 years of age or older. For every 100 females there were 105.9 males, and for every 100 females age 18 and over there were 102.8 males age 18 and over.

The racial makeup of the county was 56.5% White, 0.8% Black or African American, 1.7% American Indian and Alaska Native, 0.2% Asian, <0.1% Native Hawaiian and Pacific Islander, 23.8% from some other race, and 17.0% from two or more races. Hispanic or Latino residents of any race comprised 65.9% of the population.

<0.1% of residents lived in urban areas, while 100.0% lived in rural areas.

There were 3,332 households in the county, of which 40.0% had children under the age of 18 living in them. Of all households, 57.2% were married-couple households, 17.9% were households with a male householder and no spouse or partner present, and 20.9% were households with a female householder and no spouse or partner present. About 20.6% of all households were made up of individuals and 9.6% had someone living alone who was 65 years of age or older. There were 3,737 housing units, of which 10.8% were vacant. Among occupied housing units, 66.5% were owner-occupied and 33.5% were renter-occupied. The homeowner vacancy rate was 1.8% and the rental vacancy rate was 7.5%.

=== Racial and ethnic composition ===
Parmer County, Texas – Racial and ethnic composition Note: the US Census treats Hispanic/Latino as an ethnic category. This table excludes Latinos from the racial categories and assigns them to a separate category. Hispanics/Latinos may be of any race.
Race / Ethnicity (NH = Non-Hispanic)	Pop 2000	Pop 2010	Pop 2020	% 2000	% 2010	% 2020
White alone (NH)	4,876	3,943	3,187	48.68%	38.40%	32.29%
Black or African American alone (NH)	93	91	53	0.93%	0.89%	0.54%
Native American or Alaska Native alone (NH)	31	17	11	0.31%	0.17%	0.11%
Asian alone (NH)	28	18	14	0.28%	0.18%	0.14%
Pacific Islander alone (NH)	0	8	0	0.00%	0.08%	0.00%
Other race alone (NH)	2	2	39	0.02%	0.02%	0.40%
Mixed race or Multiracial (NH)	59	26	61	0.59%	0.25%	0.62%
Hispanic or Latino (any race)	4,927	6,164	6,504	49.19%	60.03%	65.90%
Total	10,016	10,269	9,869	100.00%	100.00%	100.00%

=== 2000 census ===
As of the 2000 census, 10,016 people, 3,322 households, and 2,614 families resided in the county. The population density was 11 people per square mile (4.2 people/km^{2}). The 3,732 housing units averaged four units per square mile (1.5 units/km^{2}). The racial makeup of the county was 66.01% White, 1.01% Black or African American, 0.76% Native American, 0.32% Asian, 0.04% Pacific Islander, 29.51% from other races, and 2.35% from two or more races. About 49.19% of the population was Hispanic or Latino of any race.

Of the 3,322 households, 42.9% had children under the age of 18 living with them, 67.0% were married couples living together, 8.3% had a female householder with no husband present, and 21.3% were not families. About 19.3% of all households were made up of individuals, and 10.5% had someone living alone who was 65 years of age or older. The average household size was 2.97 and the average family size was 3.43.

In the county, the population was distributed as 32.9% under the age of 18, 8.5% from 18 to 24, 26.2% from 25 to 44, 19.6% from 45 to 64, and 12.7% who were 65 years of age or older. The median age was 32 years. For every 100 females, there were 97.90 males. For every 100 females age 18 and over, there were 93.90 males.

The median income for a household in the county was $30,813, and for a family was $34,149. Males had a median income of $26,966 versus $19,650 for females. The per capita income for the county was $14,184. About 14.2% of families and 17.0% of the population were below the poverty line, including 20.9% of those under age 18 and 14.2% of those age 65 or over.

== Communities ==
=== Cities ===
- Bovina
- Farwell (county seat)
- Friona

=== Unincorporated community ===
- Lazbuddie

== Education ==
School districts:

- Bovina Independent School District
- Farwell Independent School District
- Friona Independent School District
- Hereford Independent School District
- Lazbuddie Independent School District

All of the county is in the service area of Amarillo College.

== Gallery ==
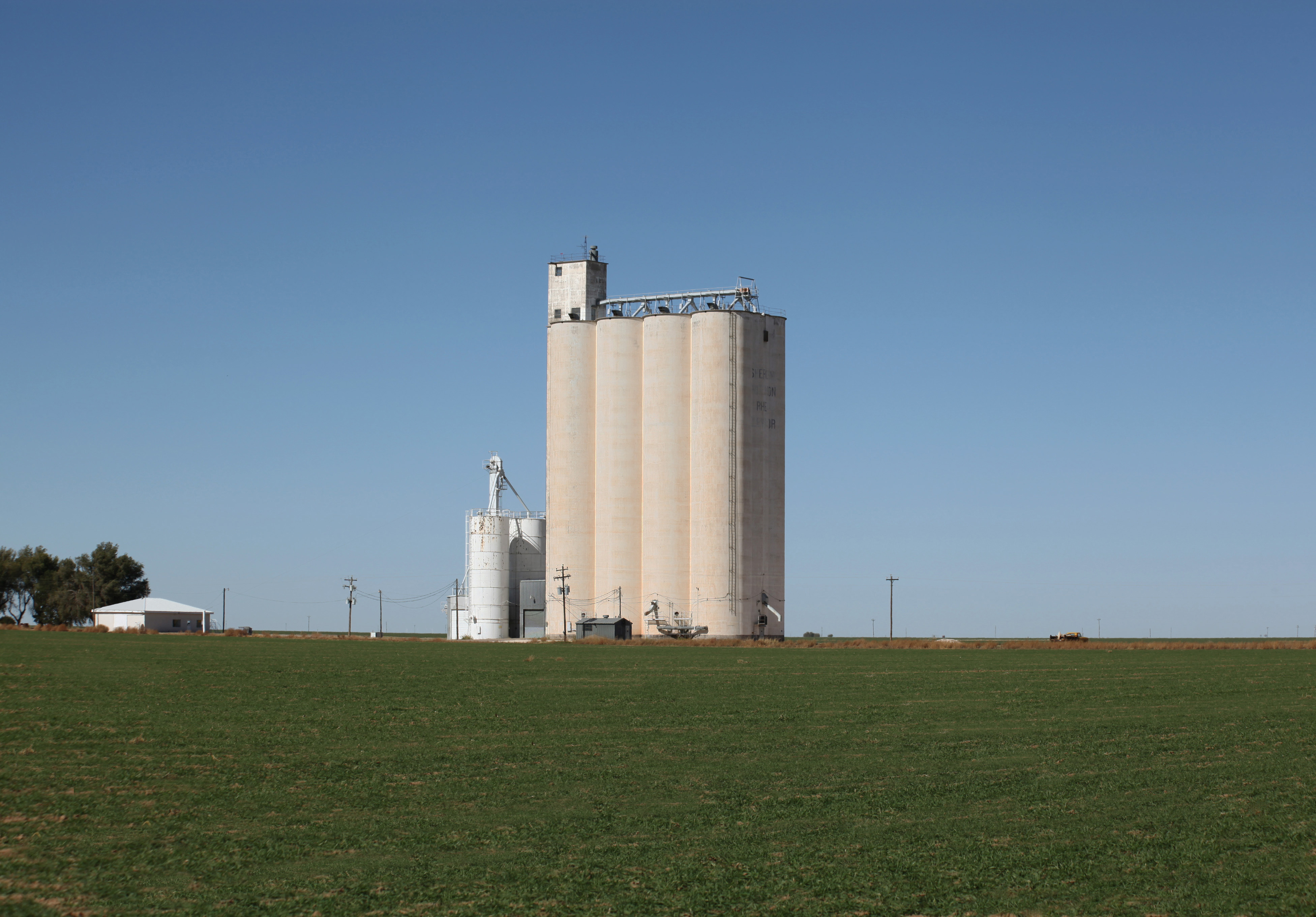
Grain elevator in northwestern Parmer County

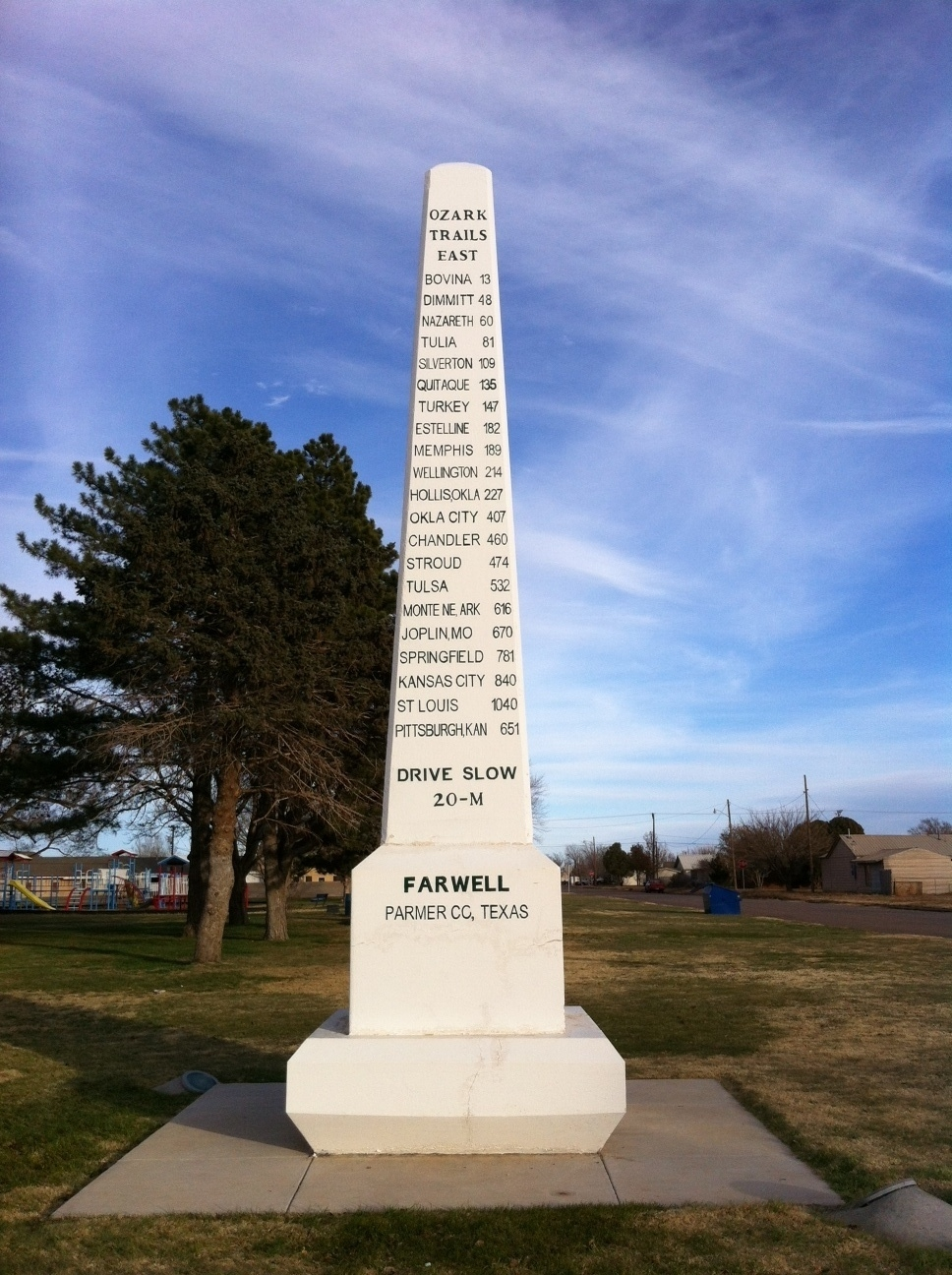
Ozark Trail monument in Farwell

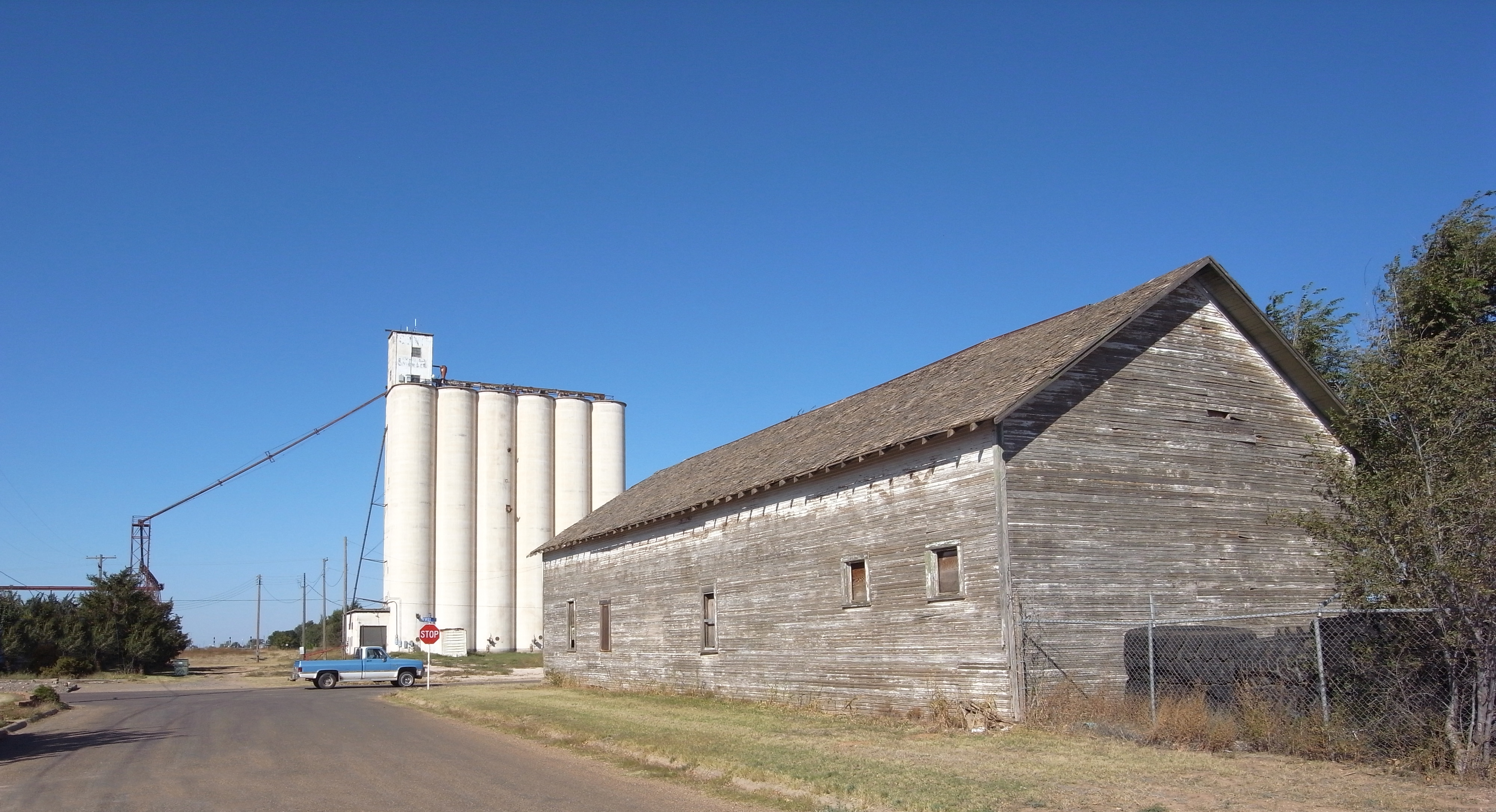
Weathered building and grain elevator in Farwell

== Politics ==
Parmer County is located within District 86 of the Texas House of Representatives. Parmer County is located within District 31 of the Texas Senate.

United States presidential election results for Parmer County, Texas
Year	Republican		Democratic		Third party(ies)	
Year	No.	%	No.	%	No.	%
1912	6	3.35%	107	59.78%	66	36.87%
1916	64	23.36%	194	70.80%	16	5.84%
1920	140	41.06%	189	55.43%	12	3.52%
1924	91	26.69%	214	62.76%	36	10.56%
1928	620	65.75%	315	33.40%	8	0.85%
1932	148	11.22%	1,154	87.49%	17	1.29%
1936	135	12.52%	936	86.83%	7	0.65%
1940	370	25.78%	1,062	74.01%	3	0.21%
1944	415	29.99%	810	58.53%	159	11.49%
1948	280	19.70%	1,091	76.78%	50	3.52%
1952	1,503	69.39%	663	30.61%	0	0.00%
1956	1,028	42.76%	1,362	56.66%	14	0.58%
1960	1,674	60.09%	1,090	39.12%	22	0.79%
1964	1,216	43.76%	1,556	55.99%	7	0.25%
1968	1,539	49.61%	833	26.85%	730	23.53%
1972	2,304	81.62%	495	17.53%	24	0.85%
1976	1,487	43.52%	1,914	56.01%	16	0.47%
1980	2,640	77.69%	707	20.81%	51	1.50%
1984	2,524	81.37%	567	18.28%	11	0.35%
1988	2,061	72.60%	764	26.91%	14	0.49%
1992	1,829	60.30%	637	21.00%	567	18.69%
1996	2,042	70.71%	676	23.41%	170	5.89%
2000	2,274	82.87%	447	16.29%	23	0.84%
2004	2,375	85.65%	389	14.03%	9	0.32%
2008	2,969	79.96%	719	19.36%	25	0.67%
2012	2,011	78.74%	529	20.71%	14	0.55%
2016	1,915	77.66%	485	19.67%	66	2.68%
2020	2,135	80.57%	488	18.42%	27	1.02%
2024	2,123	84.78%	368	14.70%	13	0.52%

United States Senate election results for Parmer County, Texas1
Year	Republican		Democratic		Third party(ies)	
Year	No.	%	No.	%	No.	%
2024	2,060	83.27%	374	15.12%	40	1.62%

United States Senate election results for Parmer County, Texas2
Year	Republican		Democratic		Third party(ies)	
Year	No.	%	No.	%	No.	%
2020	2,132	81.16%	454	17.28%	41	1.56%

Texas Gubernatorial election results for Parmer County
Year	Republican		Democratic		Third party(ies)	
Year	No.	%	No.	%	No.	%
2022	1,546	87.44%	202	11.43%	20	1.13%

== See also ==
- Dry counties
- List of museums in the Texas Panhandle
- Recorded Texas Historic Landmarks in Parmer County
