= Magicland =

- Created by: Dick Williams
- Starring: Dick Williams
- Country of origin: United States
- Original language: English
- No. of episodes: c.1,200

Production
- Running time: 30 minutes

Original release
- Network: WMC-TV
- Release: 1966 – 1989

Magicland was a television magic show for children that ran for 23 years on the Memphis, Tennessee, station WMC-TV. It holds the Guinness World Record for the longest continuously-running television magic series in the world.

The show was created by presenter Dick Williams, who was recruited to WMC-TV in 1965 as a staff announcer and weatherman. Williams was a magician in his spare time and had started a magic show under the title Magicland for his previous station KGNC-TV in Amarillo, Texas. Management at WMC-TV liked the sound of that show and persuaded Williams to create something similar for them. He agreed, but thought the series would only last for about a year. Instead, it eventually ran for 23 years and nearly 1,200 episodes.

Magicland was a weekly half-hour live-audience show aimed at children and aired at 10am on Sunday mornings. Dick "Mr. Magic" Williams performed tricks and illusions, juggled clubs and scarves, and is often remembered for his signature magician's finger exercises (photos at MagiclandTV.com). He was assisted by his wife, Virginia, who, in addition to her onscreen role, sewed costumes, organized props, arranged music, and directed other assistants.
