= KFDX-TV =

Television station in Wichita Falls, Texas

- Wichita Falls, Texas; Lawton, Oklahoma; United States
- City: Wichita Falls, Texas
- Channels: Digital: 28 (UHF); Virtual: 3
- Branding: KFDX 3; KJBO (3.2); Texoma's CW (3.3)

Programming
- Affiliations: 3.1: NBC; 3.2: Independent with MyNetworkTV; 3.3: The CW Plus; 3.4: Antenna TV

Ownership
- Owner: Nexstar Media Group; (Nexstar Media Inc.)
- Sister stations: KJTL, KJBO-LD

History
- First air date: April 12, 1953
- Former channel number: Analog: 3 (VHF, 1953–2009)
- Former affiliations: ABC (secondary, 1953–1960)
- Call sign meaning: Original owners also owned KFDM radio and television in Beaumont

Technical information
- Licensing authority: FCC
- Facility ID: 65370
- ERP: 1,000 kW
- HAAT: 269.4 m (884 ft)
- Transmitter coordinates: 33°53′23″N 98°33′31″W
- Translator(s): see § Translators

Links
- Public license information: Public file; LMS
- Website: www.texomashomepage.com

KFDX-TV (channel 3) is a television station licensed to Wichita Falls, Texas, United States, serving the western Texoma area as an affiliate of NBC and The CW Plus. It is owned by Nexstar Media Group alongside KJBO-LD (channel 35)—an independent station with MyNetworkTV—and co-managed with Fox affiliate KJTL (channel 18). The three stations share studios near Seymour Highway (US 277) and Turtle Creek Road in Wichita Falls, where KFDX-TV's transmitter is also located.

KFDX was the third station to sign on in just over a month in the Wichita Falls, Texas–Lawton, Oklahoma market and the second in Wichita Falls itself. An affiliate of NBC and ABC at launch, it became a sole NBC station when KSWO-TV in Lawton, also an ABC affiliate, added Wichita Falls to its primary coverage area in 1960.

== History ==
=== Early history ===
On May 19, 1951, Wichtex Radio and Television—a locally based company managed under the direction of Darrold A. Cannan, Sr. and Howard Fry and the owner of KFDX (990 AM)—submitted an application to the Federal Communications Commission (FCC) for a construction permit to build and license to operate a broadcast television station in Wichita Falls that would transmit on VHF channel 3. This application was resubmitted in June 1952, after the FCC lifted a four-year freeze on TV station license grants. A Dallas oilman, Needy Landrum, applied for channel 3 in October; he withdrew the application in early December, and the FCC awarded the license and permit for channel 3 to the Cannan ownership group on December 18, 1952. Construction immediately began on new studios on Seymour Road to house the radio and TV studios as well as the TV transmitter facility.

KFDX-TV first signed on the air at 6 p.m. on April 12, 1953; the first program ever broadcast on Channel 3 that evening was the local program People from Here and There. KFDX was the third television station to sign on in the Wichita Falls–Lawton market, launching one month after the sign-ons of its two principal competitors: CBS affiliate KWFT-TV (channel 6, now KAUZ-TV), which debuted on March 1, and Lawton-based KSWO-TV (channel 7), which had signed on March 8. KFDX-TV was affiliated with NBC and the ABC network at launch; KFDX radio had been an affiliate of the ABC Radio Network since 1947. (Note: KSWO-TV was not an ABC affiliate until 1955. It was not the exclusive ABC affiliate for Lawton and Wichita Falls until it activated a new transmitter site in February 1960.) The station originally employed a staff of 30 people, which, at the time, was the largest staff of any broadcast television and radio station in west Texas; the majority of stock held in Wichtex was owned by members of the station's staff.

In addition to founding channel 3 and serving as the station's original general manager, Howard Fry was best known by children in the Texoma region for his daily program Uncle Howdy's House Party, which originated on KFDX radio and launched a television broadcast that aired concurrently with the radio program. In 1955, Wichtex sold KFDX radio to Grayson Enterprises in order to concentrate on the television portion of the business, splitting it from channel 3. Among the personalities who worked at KFDX-TV during the station's early years was Don Alexander—lead singer of rock-and-roll group Alexander and the Greats, and composer of the 1964 hit single "Hot Dang Mustang", which topped songs from such musicians as Elvis Presley, The Kinks, Frank Sinatra and The Rolling Stones to peak at #6 on the Billboard Top 100—who came to the television station in 1964. For several years until he transitioned away from program hosting duties in 1966, Alexander served as host of Stage Coach Three, a weekday afternoon children's program featuring a mix of cartoon shorts and educational features; as the character of "Pinto Bean", a marshal who appeared alongside his horse sidekick Swayback, he also donned cowboy garb to host afternoon western and horror movies. After filing live reports on the Watts riots, which began as he was starting a planned trip to visit his mother in Los Angeles in August 1965, Alexander was promoted to main news anchor and occasionally headed KFDX's news department as its news director from 1966 until he departed from the station in 1980.

Nat Fleming, a local country and western bandleader, served as host of the self-titled, half-hour afternoon variety program The Nat Fleming Show on channel 3 from the station's inception in 1953 until the early 1960s, which featured a blend of musical performances (performed alongside bandmates Pee Wee Stewart, Elmer Lawrence, Buck White, Pappy Stapp and Tommy Bruce) and comedy skits. Fleming was also the longtime owner of The Cow Lot, a Wichita Falls–based western wear store which shuttered operations in 2006, and typically signed off television commercials for his store with the locally known tagline "You can tell by looking if it came from the Cow Lot" (the store also served as the homebase for the Horn Honkin' Show, a Saturday morning variety program that Fleming hosted for radio station KNIN-FM 92.9). Fleming would be honored with the North Texas Legend Award by The Museum of North Texas History in May 2012.

=== Clay, Price, and U.S. Broadcast Group ownership ===
On July 30, 1970, Wichtex Radio and Television, then managed by Fry and Darrold A. Cannan Jr., sold KFDX to Charleston, West Virginia–based Clay Broadcasting Corporation for $5.05 million; the sale was approved on January 28, 1971. Clay owned the Charleston Daily Mail and WWAY, a TV station in Wilmington, North Carolina.

As part of the divestiture of the company's newspaper and television properties, on April 30, 1987, Clay sold its KFDX and its four sister television stations—KJAC-TV in Beaumont–Port Arthur, WAPT in Jackson, Mississippi, and WWAY—to New York City–based Price Communications Corporation for $60 million; the sale was approved by the FCC on June 23.

In August 1992, KFDX became the first television station in the Wichita Falls–Lawton market to adopt a 24-hour-a-day programming schedule, initially filling overnight time periods following the NBC late night lineup with a mix of syndicated programs, a nightly encore of the station's 10 p.m. newscast, and the network's overnight newscast, NBC Nightside. On August 23, 1995, Price sold KFDX, KJAC-TV, and KSNF-TV in Joplin, Missouri, to Wakefield, Rhode Island–based upstart USA Broadcast Group for $42 million (USA soon renamed itself to U.S. Broadcast Group after USA Network filed a copyright infringement complaint against the broadcasting company).

=== Nexstar ownership ===
On January 12, 1998, Irving-based Nexstar Broadcasting Group acquired KFDX-TV, KBTV-TV and KSNF from U.S. Broadcast Group for $64.3 million. Channel 3 subsequently gained two sister stations on June 1, 1999, when Nexstar took over the operations of Fox affiliate KJTL (channel 18) and UPN affiliate KJBO-LP (channel 35)—which were acquired by Nexstar partner company Mission Broadcasting, which originated as an arm of its creditor Bastet Broadcasting, earlier that year for $15.5 million—under joint sales and shared services agreements, under which KFDX would handle news production, engineering, security and certain other services as well as handling advertising sales for the two stations. KJTL and KJBO subsequently vacated their shared facility on Call Field Road and relocated its operations two miles (3.2 km) southeast to KFDX's studio facility on Seymour Highway and Turtle Creek Road.

In January 2006, KFDX launched Texoma's Weather Channel, a 24-hour weather forecast service—with content selected by the on-duty meteorologist—that features loops of weather radar and satellite imagery, current conditions (including maps detailing actual and apparent temperatures, sustained wind speeds and gusts within the KFDX viewing area), and local and regional forecasts, along with an audio feed of Wichita Falls–based NOAA Weather Radio station WXK31; Texoma's Weather Channel is carried on Charter Spectrum channel 17 and digital channel 1234 in Wichita Falls (the service is not carried on cable providers on the Oklahoma side of the market, including Fidelity Communications in Lawton).

In December 2020, the studio building was evacuated after vandals cut a couple of guy wires to the nearby 942-foot (287 m) tower. The tower did not collapse and was repaired.

== News operation ==
As of September 2016, KFDX-TV presently broadcasts 27 hours, 25 minutes of locally produced newscasts each week (with 5 hours, 5 minutes each weekday and one hour each on Saturdays and Sundays). Channel 3 also produces the half-hour sports highlight/analysis program KFDX 3 Sports Sunday, which airs after the Sunday edition of the 10 p.m. newscast.

In addition, KFDX produces five hours of locally produced newscasts each week for KJTL (with one hour on weekdays). Through the shared services agreement with KJTL, the station may also simulcast long-form severe weather coverage on channel 18 in the event that a tornado warning is issued for any county in its viewing area of southwestern Oklahoma and western north Texas. KFDX primarily competes for the Texas audience with KAUZ, while KSWO has a stronghold on the Oklahoma side of the market; overall, this puts KFDX at second place among the market's local newscasts.

=== News department history ===
A staple of channel 3's schedule was RFD-3, a long-running early morning agriculture and public affairs program which premiered in 1964. Originally airing weekdays at 6:30 a.m., before the launch of a conventional morning newscast in the early 1990s eventually led to the program moving to a 5 a.m. slot as the latter program expanded, it was hosted for the majority of its existence by Joe Brown, who served as the station's farm director beginning in the early 1960s and also worked as farm editor for the Wichita Falls Times Record News. RFD-3 ended its 47-year run in August 2011, following Brown's retirement from broadcasting. The station launched a similar program, Texoma Country, which originated as a 15-minute segment that aired during KFDX 3 News Today before expanding to a separate half-hour program serving as a lead-in to the morning newscast—as Texoma Country Morning—in 2014 (the program is co-hosted by Mike Campbell and Joe Tom White, who had previously co-hosted a morning news/talk show on KWFS [1290 AM]; White joined the program in 2014, after announcing his departure from KWFS).

For many years, Warren Silver—who originally joined KFDX as a member of its production staff when it signed on in March 1953—served as the station's chief weathercaster and continuity announcer as well as acting as the original host of RFD-3. After the station's sale to Clay Communications, Silver was promoted to a management position as the station's general manager, and headed channel 3's operations from 1971 to 1988. After his retirement, Silver continued to serve as a contributor for the station's newscasts, hosting "The Silver Report", a weekly feature segment reporting on issues affecting senior citizens that aired during the 6 p.m. edition of Newscenter 3 until his death in 2001. Another longtime weathercaster who appeared on channel 3's newscasts from 1954 to 1971 was Tom Crane, who was known by his nickname, "Tom Crane, the Weathervane". After he left KFDX, Crane worked as vice president of City National Bank in Wichita Falls, and later operated local advertising agency Crane & Company from 1980 until his death on July 6, 2009.

During the late morning of April 3, 1964, a destructive tornado ripped through the City View section of northwestern Wichita Falls and neighboring Sheppard Air Force Base. The event made history as it would become one of the first tornadoes ever to be shown on live television. As rival KAUZ-TV interrupted regular programming that morning to show live footage of the tornado through a studio camera brought outside of channel 6's Seymour Highway studios, KFDX also moved one of its studio cameras outside its facility and pointed it toward the tornado—which initially appeared as a large, rotating dust cloud—as it approached the northwest portion of Wichita Falls, with Shaw and reporter Dee Fletcher providing commentary (sometimes interfered by line voltage and wind noise severe enough that cameramen positioned outside could not hear instructions warning viewers of the approaching tornado over their headphones). The 800-foot-wide (240 m) tornado (later retroactively rated as an F5 on the Fujita Scale) killed seven people, injured 111 others, and produced damage estimated at $15 million (with around 225 homes and businesses on the north side of town and at Sheppard AFB being reported destroyed).

During the afternoon and evening of April 10, 1979, about 15 years after the City View twister, KFDX-TV provided complete coverage of an outbreak of tornadic thunderstorms that spawned several strong to violent tornadoes across northwest Texas and southwestern Oklahoma. That evening's coverage culminated with the opening segment of the 6 p.m. edition of Newscenter 3, as chief meteorologist Bill Warren was relaying reports of a multiple-vortex tornado that was beginning its path of destruction across southern sections of Wichita Falls. Four minutes into the newscast, electricity to the KFDX studio and transmitter facilities went down as the storm knocked sections of the city's electrical grid offline. (KAUZ, KSWO and five of the six radio stations operating in the Wichita Falls area at the time also lost power in the storm, although local radio station KTRN [102.3, now KWFS-FM] was able to remain on-air as it had an auxiliary power supply.) Along its 45-mile-long (72 km), two-mile-wide (3.2 km) path, the F4 tornado killed 42 and injured more than 1,700 people, and produced damage estimated at around $400 million; among the 20,000 residents estimated to have been left homeless because of the twister, sixteen of them were part of KFDX-TV's 39-person staff at the time. When the station came back on the air at 6:56 p.m. the following evening (April 11), KFDX provided 3 1/2 hours of continuous live coverage of the aftermath of the tornado. One week later, Channel 3 broadcast a half-hour documentary about the 1979 tornado, Terrible Tuesday, chronicling the Wichita Falls tornado and its aftermath by way of news footage taken by the station after the storm.

Former KFDX chief meteorologist Skip McBride, a retired airman who joined the station as its weekday evening meteorologist on January 29, 1983, was the area's longest-running local television weathercaster. McBride's 31-year tenure—which lasted until his retirement on November 20, 2014—was surpassed only by that of Joe Brown for the longest-tenured television personality in the Wichita Falls-Lawton market; McBride was replaced as chief meteorologist by Kevin Selle (who joined KFDX/KJTL from Texas Cable News, where he previously served as chief meteorologist since the regional news channel's launch in 1998).

In August 1992, KFDX also implemented the "24-Hour News Source" concept (which was enforced in the promotional slogan used by the station until 2005, "Texoma's 24-Hour News Team"). Providing news headlines to viewers at times when the station was not carrying regularly scheduled, long-form newscasts, the concept involved both the production of 30-second news updates that aired at or near the top of each hour and brief weather updates every half-hour during local commercial break inserts within syndicated and NBC network programs—even during prime time network and overnight programming—in addition to the existing half-hourly updates it aired during Today. (Producers and other newsroom personnel anchored the segments for several years during the 1990s.) KFDX discontinued production of these hourly updates in 2005.

Following its sale to Mission Broadcasting and the formation of the SSA between the two stations, on September 20, 1999, KFDX began producing a half-hour newscast at 9 p.m. through a news share agreement with Fox affiliate KJTL; the program, titled Fox 18 News at 9:00, was the first local prime time newscast to debut in the market and originated from a secondary set at the KFDX/KJTL/KJBO studios on Seymour Highway in Wichita Falls. The newscast was eventually canceled after the December 31, 2001, edition, due to poor ratings. After a four-year sabbatical, KFDX launched a second venture at a prime time newscast for channel 18 on September 17, 2007. Originally titled Fox: Texoma's News at 9:00 (later retitled Texoma's Fox News at Nine in September 2011). The program competed against an existing 9 p.m. newscast on CW affiliate KAUZ-DT2, which parent station KAUZ-TV premiered in September 2006; it would gain another prime time news competitor in September 2012, when KSWO began producing a newscast for its Live Well Network–affiliated DT3 subchannel (now a This TV affiliate). As a result of the cancellations of KSWO and KAUZ's 9 p.m. news broadcasts (in September 2015 and July 2017, respectively), the KFDX-produced newscast is currently the only local prime time news program in the market.

In July 2012, KFDX became the second television station in the Wichita Falls-Lawton market (after KSWO) to begin broadcasting its local newscasts in high definition; the 9 p.m. newscast on KJTL was included in the upgrade. Footage shot in-studio has been broadcast in high definition since the conversion, while all news video from on-remote locations was initially broadcast in standard definition and upconverted to widescreen until April 2013, when KFDX/KJTL upgraded its ENG vehicles, satellite truck, studio and field cameras and other equipment in order to broadcast news footage from the field and the newsroom in high definition, in addition to segments broadcast from the main studio.

==== Notable former on-air staff ====
- Heidi Collins – anchor/reporter
- Brad Edwards – anchor/reporter/photographer
- John Hambrick – anchor/reporter (1964)
- Frances Rivera – news anchor/reporter

== Technical information ==
=== Subchannels ===
The station's signal is multiplexed:

Subchannels of KFDX-TV
Channel	Res.	Short name	Programming
3.1	1080i	KFDX-DT	NBC
3.2	1080i	KJBO-DT	KJBO-LD (Independent with MyNetworkTV)
3.3	720p	CW	The CW Plus
3.4	480i	ANT-TV	Antenna TV

Simulcast of subchannels of another station

=== Analog-to-digital conversion ===
KFDX-TV signed on a digital signal on UHF channel 28 in 2003; the station began broadcasting NBC network programming in high definition in 2009, when KFDX upgraded its main digital feed to the 1080i resolution format. The station shut down its analog signal, over VHF channel 3, on June 12, 2009, the official date on which full-power television stations in the United States transitioned from analog to digital television under federal mandate. The station's digital signal remained on its pre-transition UHF channel 28, using virtual channel 3.

=== Translators ===
KFDX-TV's signal is additionally rebroadcast over the following translators, operated by translator systems in Texas and Oklahoma:

- Quanah, Texas: K24NU-D, K27HM-D
- Altus, Oklahoma: K29LJ-D
