= Channel 4 virtual TV stations in the United States =

The following television stations operate on virtual channel 4 in the United States:

- K02LH-D in Clarks Fork, Wyoming
- K03DJ-D in Polson, Montana
- K04DH-D in Gunnison, Colorado
- K04GF-D in Wolf Point, Montana
- K04JF-D in Nulato, Alaska
- K04JH-D in Homer, Alaska
- K04KP-D in Northway, Alaska
- K04KV-D in Unalaska, Alaska
- K04LB-D in Pelican, Alaska
- K04LZ-D in Galena, Alaska
- K04MM-D in Hyder, Alaska
- K04MN-D in Wales, Alaska
- K04MR-D in Gustavus, Alaska
- K04MT-D in Newtok, Alaska
- K04NK-D in Dolores, Colorado
- K04ON-D in Weber Canyon, Colorado
- K04OO-D in Ismay Canyon, Colorado
- K04QP-D in Casas Adobes, Arizona
- K04QV-D in Thompson Falls, Montana
- K04SA-D in Alexandria, Louisiana
- K04SD-D in Victoria, Texas
- K04SE-D in Parker, Arizona
- K04SF-D in Gustine, California
- K05BU-D in Enterprise, Utah
- K05MU-D in Leavenworth, Washington
- K06JA-D in Cedar Canyon, Utah
- K06NV-D in White Sulphur Spring, Montana
- K06QF-D in Heron, Montana
- K07CH-D in Plains & Paradise, Montana
- K07DU-D in Ely & McGill, Nevada
- K07DV-D in Ruth, Nevada
- K07IB-D in Whitewater, Montana
- K07NL-D in Juliaetta, Idaho
- K07OC-D in Polaris, Montana
- K08CB-D in Lund & Preston, Nevada
- K08CW-D in Malott/Wakefield, Washington
- K08CX-D in Tonasket, Washington
- K08FS-D in Dodson, Montana
- K08KA-D in Girdwood, Alaska
- K08KT-D in Boulder, Montana
- K08PX-D in Long Valley Junction, Utah
- K08QB-D in Crouch/Garden Valley, Idaho
- K08QC-D in Sigurd & Salina, Utah
- K08QD-D in Woodland & Kamas, Utah
- K08QF-D in East Price, Utah
- K08QH-D in Roosevelt, etc., Utah
- K09BG-D in Basin, Montana
- K09FQ-D in Thompson Falls, Montana
- K09KJ-D in Tierra Amarilla, New Mexico
- K09LO-D in Cascade, Idaho
- K09QH-D in Kenai, Alaska
- K09SU-D in Hildale, etc., Utah
- K09WB-D in Powderhorn, Colorado
- K09YH-D in Scottsbluff, Nebraska
- K10DM-D in Riverside, Washington
- K10KR-D in Coolin, Idaho
- K10LG-D in Dryden, Washington
- K10LM-D in Laketown, etc., Utah
- K10LQ-D in Manhattan, Nevada
- K10MG-D in Socorro, New Mexico
- K10QH-D in Trout Creek, etc., Montana
- K10RA-D in Coulee City, Washington
- K11AT-D in Gunnison, Colorado
- K11CQ-D in Cedar City, Utah
- K11GH-D in Tri Cities, etc., Oregon
- K11HM-D in Bonners Ferry, Idaho
- K11IH-D in Malta, Montana
- K11KP-D in Troy, Montana
- K11OO-D in Pine Valley, etc., Utah
- K11PB-D in Cambridge, Idaho
- K11TJ-D in Sargents, Colorado
- K11WF-D in Mink Creek, Idaho
- K11WR-D in Council, Idaho
- K11WT-D in McCall, Idaho
- K12AK-D in Crested Butte, Colorado
- K12AL-D in Waunita Hot Springs, Colorado
- K12BA-D in Winthrop-Twisp, Washington
- K12CX-D in Tonasket, Washington
- K12QW-D in Silver City, New Mexico
- K12XD-D in Aurora, etc., Utah
- K13HK-D in Sand Springs, Montana
- K13HM-D in Myrtle Creek, Oregon
- K13PZ-D in Poplar, Montana
- K13QK-D in Virgin, Utah
- K14MU-D in Weatherford, Oklahoma
- K14NF-D in Jacks Cabin, Colorado
- K14PF-D in Peoa/Oakley, Utah
- K14QV-D in Childress, Texas
- K14RY-D in Malad & surrounding area, Idaho
- K14SF-D in Brewster, etc., Washington
- K15HK-D in Sheridan, Wyoming
- K15HL-D in Cherokee & Alva, Oklahoma
- K15II-D in Newcastle, Wyoming
- K15KM-D in Sundance, Wyoming
- K15KT-D in Rural Sevier County, Utah
- K15KU-D in Teasdale/Torrey, Utah
- K15KY-D in Richfield, etc., Utah
- K15KZ-D in Koosharem, Utah
- K15LA-D in Panguitch, Utah
- K15LC-D in Henrieville, Utah
- K15LO-D in Fruitland, Utah
- K15MP-D in Rawlins, Wyoming
- K16DX-D in Gage, Oklahoma
- K16EK-D in Idalia, Colorado
- K16ET-D in Pleasant Valley, Colorado
- K16HD-D in Green River, Utah
- K16IO-D in Chugwater, Wyoming
- K16LG-D in Lund & Preston, Nevada
- K16LM-D in Teton Village, Wyoming
- K16LS-D in Grangeville, etc., Idaho
- K16LT-D in Dubois, etc., Wyoming
- K16LZ-D in Rural Garfield County, Utah
- K16MS-D in Cedar City, Utah
- K16MZ-D in Orangeville, Utah
- K16NU-D in Mountain View, etc., Wyoming
- K17FK-D in Montoya & Newkirk, New Mexico
- K17HQ-D in Hatch, Utah
- K17HY-D in Ridgecrest, etc., California
- K17ID-D in Cherokee & Alva, Oklahoma
- K17IP-D in Huntsville, etc., Utah
- K17JE-D in Mayfield, Utah
- K17KU-D in Saco, Montana
- K17KZ-D in Harlowton, etc., Montana
- K17NG-D in Sage Junction, Wyoming
- K17NI-D in Mesa, Colorado
- K18FU-D in Rural Beaver County, Utah
- K18IQ-D in Jacks Cabin, Colorado
- K18IR-D in Olivia, Minnesota
- K18JD-D in Torrington, Wyoming
- K18JJ-D in Crowheart, Wyoming
- K18LS-D in Strong City, Oklahoma
- K18LT-D in Eagle Nest, New Mexico
- K18LY-D in Seiling, Oklahoma
- K18MV-D in Scipio/Holden, Utah
- K18MZ-D in Forsyth, Montana
- K19DI-D in Crowley Lake – Long, California
- K19DS-D in Pitkin, Colorado
- K19EY-D in Myton, Utah
- K19FF-D in Miles City, Montana
- K19FG-D in Jackson, Wyoming
- K19GN-D in Mount Pleasant, Utah
- K19GX-D in Buffalo, Wyoming
- K19HJ-D in Pinedale, etc., Wyoming
- K19JC-D in Mazama, Washington
- K19JM-D in Emigrant, Montana
- K19KW-D in Greybull, Wyoming
- K19LM-D in Cody/Powell, Wyoming
- K19MG-D in Rawlins, Wyoming
- K20FR-D in Hawthorne, Nevada
- K20HA-D in Caballo, New Mexico
- K20JD-D in Cherokee & Alva, Oklahoma
- K20JE-D in Navajo Mtn. Sch., etc., Utah
- K20JF-D in Oljeto, Utah
- K20KC-D in Mexican Hat, etc., Utah
- K20LK-D in Colstrip, etc., Montana
- K20MF-D in Orderville, Utah
- K20NI-D in Akron, Colorado
- K20NM-D in Leamington, Utah
- K20NT-D in McDermitt, Nevada
- K21FO-D in Winnemucca, Nevada
- K21GJ-D in Eureka, Nevada
- K21IB-D in Circleville, Utah
- K21JX-D in Huntington, Utah
- K21JZ-D in Nephi, Utah
- K21OH-D in Datil/Horse Springs, New Mexico
- K21OJ-D in Ruth, Nevada
- K21OT-D in Pasco-Kennewick, Washington
- K22DV-D in Alexandria, Minnesota
- K22ID-D in Alva – Cherokee, Oklahoma
- K22JR-D in Turkey, Texas
- K22NB-D in Kanarraville etc., Utah
- K22NJ-D in Lucerne, Wyoming
- K22NM-D in Las Cruces, New Mexico
- K23DS-D in Evanston, Wyoming
- K23IX-D in Clark, etc., Wyoming
- K23IZ-D in Strong City, Oklahoma
- K23JC-D in Montezuma Creek/Aneth, Utah
- K23KC-D in Bluff, etc., Utah
- K23LF-D in Eureka, Nevada
- K23MT-D in Mexican Hat, Utah
- K23ND-D in Sayre, Oklahoma
- K23NF-D in Romeo, etc., Colorado
- K23NN-D in Las Vegas, New Mexico
- K23NQ-D in Lewiston, Idaho
- K23NY-D in St. George, Utah
- K23OI-D in Tucumcari, New Mexico
- K24GT-D in Kemmerer, Wyoming
- K24HP-D in Price, etc., Utah
- K24JG-D in Norfolk, Nebraska
- K24KJ-D in Libby, Montana
- K24MK-D in Glenrock, Wyoming
- K24MQ-D in Marysvale, Utah
- K24MU-D in Summit County, Utah
- K24NE-D in Overton, Nevada
- K24NK-D in Memphis, Texas
- K25CP-D in Tulia, Texas
- K25FI-D in Mora, New Mexico
- K25JQ-D in May, etc., Oklahoma
- K25LI-D in Wright, Wyoming
- K25OR-D in McCall, Idaho
- K25PP-D in Eureka, Nevada
- K26CK-D in Cottonwood/Grangeville, Idaho
- K26DX-D in Raton, New Mexico
- K26HO-D in Glide, Oregon
- K26IS-D in Woodward, etc., Oklahoma
- K26JY-D in Duckwater, Nevada
- K26LR-D in Helper, Utah
- K26MS-D in Collbran, Colorado
- K26NL-D in Gillette, Wyoming
- K26NM-D in Pullman, Washington
- K26OE-D in Elko, Nevada
- K26OW-D in Garden Valley, Idaho
- K26PD-D in Scobey, Montana
- K26PG-D in Woody Creek, Colorado
- K27IM-D in Billings, Montana
- K27KA-D in Parlin, Colorado
- K27LK-D in Gateview, Colorado
- K27NL-D in Clovis, New Mexico
- K27OD-D in Verdi/Mogul, Nevada
- K27OU-D in Lovell, Wyoming
- K28EA-D in Washington, Utah
- K28GI-D in Guymon, Oklahoma
- K28GX-D in Walker Lake, Nevada
- K28JU-D in Rock Springs, etc., Wyoming
- K28LH-D in Beowawe, Nevada
- K28MK-D in Phillips County, Montana
- K28OQ-D in Fishlake Resort, Utah
- K28OU-D in Henefer, etc., Utah
- K28OY-D in Sierra Vista, Arizona
- K28PC-D in Fillmore, etc., Utah
- K28PP-D in Shurz, Nevada
- K29EV-D in Valmy, Nevada
- K29HV-D in La Barge, etc., Wyoming
- K29IG-D in Sunlight Basin, Wyoming
- K29IH-D in Meeteetse, etc., Wyoming
- K29IS-D in Round Mountain, Nevada
- K29IU-D in Parlin, Colorado
- K29JO-D in Douglas, Wyoming
- K29KR-D in Camas Valley, Oregon
- K29LC-D in Truth or Consequence, New Mexico
- K29LX-D in Hanksville, Utah
- K29MZ-D in Clarendon, Texas
- K30DS-D in Lovelock, Nevada
- K30GJ-D in Colfax, New Mexico
- K30KM-D in Vernal, etc., Utah
- K30KX-D in Taos, New Mexico
- K30LB-D in Beowawe, Nevada
- K30OE-D in Alton, Utah
- K30OR-D in Escalante, Utah
- K30OY-D in Logan, Utah
- K30PA-D in Roseau, Minnesota
- K30PH-D in Beaver, etc., Utah
- K30PT-D in Kalispell & Lakeside, Montana
- K31DC-D in Freedom, Wyoming
- K31FP-D in Heber/Midway, Utah
- K31FQ-D in Park City, Utah
- K31FR-D in Preston, Idaho
- K31IE-D in Susanville, etc., California
- K31IS-D in Toquerville, Utah
- K31IU-D in Morgan, etc., Utah
- K31JC-D in Duchesne, Utah
- K31JO-D in Wood River, etc., Wyoming
- K31JP-D in Manila, etc., Utah
- K31JQ-D in Woodward, etc., Oklahoma
- K31LF-D in Clareton, Wyoming
- K31MD-D in Kasilof, Alaska
- K31OM-D in Garrison, etc., Utah
- K32DC-D in Kanab, Utah
- K32GK-D in Elko, Nevada
- K32HP-D in Hanna, etc., Utah
- K32HQ-D in Boulder, Utah
- K32HV-D in Vernal, etc., Utah
- K32IF-D in North Fork, etc., Wyoming
- K32JB-D in Fountain Green, Utah
- K32ML-D in Rural Garfield County, Utah
- K32MO-D in Capitol Reef National Park, Utah
- K32MP-D in Caineville, Utah
- K32MQ-D in Fremont, Utah
- K32MS-D in Livingston, Montana
- K32MT-D in Tropic, etc., Utah
- K32MZ-D in Samak, Utah
- K32ND-D in Modena, etc., Utah
- K32NL-D in Deming, New Mexico
- K32NR-D in Winnemucca, Nevada
- K32OF-D in Elk City, Oklahoma
- K33AF-D in Ninilchik, Alaska
- K33DB-D in Alexandria, Minnesota
- K33DR-D in Montpelier, Idaho
- K33JI-D in Scofield, Utah
- K33JM-D in Mooreland, etc., Oklahoma
- K33JQ-D in Big Piney, etc., Wyoming
- K33LB-D in Redwood Falls, Minnesota
- K33LG-D in Bridger, etc., Montana
- K33NM-D in Omak, etc., Washington
- K33OT-D in Willmar, Minnesota
- K33OY-D in Blanding/Monticello, Utah
- K33QL-D in Snowmass Village, Colorado
- K34AG-D in Parowan/Enoch, etc., Utah
- K34CM-D in Ely, Nevada
- K34CX-D in Apple Valley, Utah
- K34FR-D in Randolph & Woodruff, Utah
- K34OE-D in Manti, etc., Utah
- K34OK-D in Coalville, Utah
- K34PD-D in Spring Glen, Utah
- K34PY-D in Mina/Luning, Nevada
- K34QL-D in Fallon, Nevada
- K34QX-D in Roundup, Montana
- K35FP in Tucumcari, New Mexico
- K35GO-D in Haxtun, Colorado
- K35IU-D in Frost, Minnesota
- K35IZ-D in Jackson, Minnesota
- K35KE-D in Hollis, Oklahoma
- K35MN-D in Omak, etc., Washington
- K35MQ-D in Weatherford, Oklahoma
- K35NU-D in Delta, Oak City, etc., Utah
- K35OA-D in Emery, Utah
- K35OB-D in Green River, Utah
- K35OC-D in Ferron, Utah
- K35OD-D in Clear Creek, Utah
- K35OL-D in Yuma, Colorado
- K36AC-D in Yuma, Colorado
- K36BW-D in Thompson Falls, Montana
- K36DI-D in Santa Rosa, New Mexico
- K36IG-D in Antimony, Utah
- K36JS-D in Grants, New Mexico
- K36LU-D in Ely, Nevada
- K36LX-D in Jacks Cabin, Colorado
- K36OU-D in Mountain View, Wyoming
- K36OV-D in Wanship, Utah
- KAID in Boise, Idaho
- KAKZ-LD in Cathedral City, California
- KAMR-TV in Amarillo, Texas
- KARK-TV in Little Rock, Arkansas
- KBTV-TV in Port Arthur, Texas
- KCNC-TV in Denver, Colorado
- KCWC-DT in Lander, Wyoming
- KCWO-TV in Big Spring, Texas
- KDBC-TV in El Paso, Texas
- KDFW in Dallas, Texas
- KDTL-LD in St. Louis, Missouri
- KFOR-TV in Oklahoma City, Oklahoma
- KFQX in Grand Junction, Colorado
- KGBT-TV in Harlingen, Texas
- KHMT in Hardin, Montana
- KHVO in Hilo, Hawaii
- KITV in Honolulu, Hawaii
- KJNP-TV in North Pole, Alaska
- KLBY in Colby, Kansas
- KMAU in Wailuku, Hawaii
- KMNZ-LD in Coeur d'Alene, Idaho
- KMOV in St. Louis, Missouri
- KNBC in Los Angeles, California
- KNEP-TV in Scottsbluff, Nebraska
- KOB in Albuquerque, New Mexico
- KOMO-TV in Seattle, Washington
- KPIC in Roseburg, Oregon
- KPRY-TV in Pierre, South Dakota
- KRDK-TV in Valley City, North Dakota
- KRNV-DT in Reno, Nevada
- KRON-TV in San Francisco, California
- KSNB-TV in York, Nebraska
- KTBY in Anchorage, Alaska
- KTIV in Sioux City, Iowa
- KTVX in Salt Lake City, Utah
- KUMN-LD in Moses Lake, etc., Washington
- KUWB-LD in Bloomington, Utah
- KVHF-LD in Fresno, California
- KVOA in Tucson, Arizona
- KWSE in Williston, North Dakota
- KXLF-TV in Butte, Montana
- KXLY-TV in Spokane, Washington
- KXMN-LD in Spokane, etc., Washington
- W03AK-D in Ela, etc., North Carolina
- W04DN-D in Auburn, Alabama
- W04DW-D in Sylva, etc., North Carolina
- W04DX-D in Tallahassee, Florida
- W04DY-D in Maple Valley, Michigan
- W04DZ-D in Sutton, West Virginia
- W05AR-D in Bryson City, etc., North Carolina
- W06AJ-D in Franklin, etc., North Carolina
- W07DS-D in Burnsville, North Carolina
- W07DT-D in Tryon & Columbus, North Carolina
- W10AK-D in Spruce Pine, North Carolina
- W10AL-D in Cherokee, etc., North Carolina
- W10DF-D in Canton, etc., North Carolina
- WACP in Atlantic City, New Jersey
- WAPA-TV in San Juan, Puerto Rico
- WBZ-TV in Boston, Massachusetts
- WCBI-TV in Columbus, Mississippi
- WCCO-TV in Minneapolis, Minnesota
- WCMH-TV in Columbus, Ohio
- WDAF-TV in Kansas City, Missouri
- WDIV-TV in Detroit, Michigan
- WFOR-TV in Miami, Florida
- WGWG in Charleston, South Carolina
- WHBF-TV in Rock Island, Illinois
- WIVB-TV in Buffalo, New York
- WJXT in Jacksonville, Florida
- WLCU-CD in Campbellsville, Kentucky
- WMOW in Crandon, Wisconsin
- WNBC in New York, New York
- WNHT-LD in Birmingham, Alabama
- WNJX-TV in Mayaguez, Puerto Rico
- WOAI-TV in San Antonio, Texas
- WOAY-TV in Oak Hill, West Virginia
- WODN-LD in Portage, Indiana
- WRC-TV in Washington, D.C.
- WSKY-TV in Manteo, North Carolina
- WSMV-TV in Nashville, Tennessee
- WTAE-TV in Pittsburgh, Pennsylvania
- WTIN-TV in Ponce, Puerto Rico
- WTMJ-TV in Milwaukee, Wisconsin
- WTOM-TV in Cheboygan, Michigan
- WTTV in Bloomington, Indiana
- WTVY in Dothan, Alabama
- WUNC-TV in Chapel Hill, North Carolina
- WUVM-LD in Atlanta, Georgia
- WWAY-LD in Wilmington, North Carolina
- WWL-TV in New Orleans, Louisiana
- WYFF in Greenville, South Carolina

The following stations, which are no longer licensed, formerly operated on virtual channel 4:

- K03IZ-D in Salinas, California
- K04OF-D in Sargents, Colorado
- K06QO-D in Martinsdale, Montana
- K10AF-D in Troy, Montana
- K16CP-D in Granite Falls, Minnesota
- K17ML-D in Red River, New Mexico
- K24DA-D in Big Piney, etc., Wyoming
- K26PH-D in Clarks Fork, Wyoming
- K29BH-D in Wellington, Texas
- K29BR-D in Canadian, Texas
- K31GC-D in Forrest, New Mexico
- K33JB-D in Orderville, Utah
- K38BU-D in Gruver, Texas
- K39KE-D in Chalfant Valley, California
- K39LV-D in Perryton, Texas
- K41BW-D in New Mobeetie, Texas
- K42CH-D in Capulin, etc., New Mexico
- K42GN-D in Preston, Idaho
- K43LV-D in Chalfant Valley, California
- K49BB-D in Follett, Texas
- K51AQ-D in Ukiah, California
