= KCIT =

Television station in Amarillo, Texas

- Amarillo, Texas; United States
- Channels: Digital: 15 (UHF); Virtual: 14
- Branding: KCIT Fox 14 (general); Fox 14 News (newscasts)

Programming
- Affiliations: 14.1: Fox; for others, see § Subchannels

Ownership
- Owner: Mission Broadcasting, Inc.
- Operator: Nexstar Media Group via JSA/SSA
- Sister stations: KAMR-TV, KCPN-LD

History
- First air date: October 24, 1982 (Note: The Television Factbook states KCIT's sign-on date as October 29.)
- Former call signs: KJTV (1982–1985)
- Former channel numbers: Analog: 14 (UHF, 1982–2009)
- Former affiliations: Independent (1982–1986); FNN (secondary, 1982–1985)
- Call sign meaning: "CIT" = "See It"

Technical information
- Licensing authority: FCC
- Facility ID: 33722
- ERP: 925 kW
- HAAT: 464 m (1,522 ft)
- Transmitter coordinates: 35°20′33.1″N 101°49′21.2″W
- Translator(s): see § Translators

Links
- Public license information: Public file; LMS
- Website: www.myhighplains.com

KCIT (channel 14) is a television station in Amarillo, Texas, United States, affiliated with the Fox network. It is owned by Mission Broadcasting and operated by Nexstar Media Group under joint sales and shared services agreements (JSA/SSA), making it sister to KAMR-TV (channel 4), an NBC affiliate, and KCPN-LD (channel 33), an independent station with MyNetworkTV. The three stations share studios on Southeast 11th Avenue and South Fillmore Street in downtown Amarillo; KCIT's transmitter is located on Dumas Drive (US 87–287) and Reclamation Plant Road in rural unincorporated Potter County.

== History ==
=== As an independent station ===
The station first signed on the air on October 24, 1982, as KJTV. Not counting satellite stations, it was the fourth commercial television station—after NBC affiliate KAMR-TV (channel 4), which signed on as KGNC-TV on March 18, 1953, CBS affiliate KFDA-TV (channel 10), which signed on April 4, 1953, and ABC affiliate KVII-TV (channel 7), which signed on the air on December 21, 1957—and the first commercial UHF outlet to sign on in the Amarillo market. The station was founded and owned by Ray Moran, who, in March 1981, purchased the construction permit for the UHF channel 14 allocation that the Federal Communications Commission (FCC) originally granted to Amarillo Family Television (owned by Gary L. Acker, who operated several Christian radio stations across Texas, Louisiana, Florida and Missouri through various subsidiaries) in a $624,000 swap for the license of radio station KRIZ (now KBCQ-FM) in Roswell, New Mexico.

Operating as an independent station, channel 14 maintained a programming inventory typical of a non-network-affiliated outlet, consisting of first-run and off-network sitcoms and drama series, classic off-network westerns (with films from the genre airing on Friday nights under the sponsored Western Theater umbrella), feature films in prime time and on weekend afternoons (with those airing on Monday through Thursday evenings presented under the Star Movie umbrella) and cartoons. KJTV also carried business news programming from the Financial News Network each weekday afternoon until 1985.

Channel 14, however, housed older transmission equipment and was fairly prone to technical problems during its run as an independent. The station's transmitter failed on its first night of operation and did not return to the air until the following morning. Its programming was fed to the Amarillo facility from an off-air receiver relayed by microwave link from sister station KJAA in Lubbock; this method of relaying the signal produced a blurred feed. Most of its transmission equipment, while new, was also of low quality. Commercials aired during program breaks were played on 3/4-inch (1.9 cm) tape decks that suffered from repeated picture glitches at the beginning and end of each ad. The picture format was also substandard, with RF interference being prevalent over the audio feed as the equipment was housed in a room next to the station's transmission tower (located along US 87–287 at KVII's original transmitter facility), which housed an older model RCA transmitter dish that produced a low-power, 128-kW signal that barely covered the entire Amarillo metropolitan area.

In November 1984, Moran sold the station to Ralph C. Wilson Industries Inc. (owned by Detroit businessman and Buffalo Bills founder Ralph Wilson) for $1 million; the sale received FCC approval on December 11, 1984. Wilson heavily invested in the station, constructing a state-of-the-art studio and office facility on South Fillmore Street in downtown Amarillo, and a 1,522-foot (464 m) transmitter tower north of Amarillo that produced a more powerful signal that reached much of the Texas Panhandle. Subsequently, on August 11, 1985, the station changed its call letters to KCIT (a phoneticism for "See It"); the former KJTV call letters soon after moved to the former KJAA-TV in Lubbock which later affiliated with Fox there. Around that time, the station changed its on-air branding to "TV-14 KCIT". During its later years as an independent station and its early years as a Fox affiliate, KJTV/KCIT heavily relied on sponsorships from Amarillo area businesses for its programming, including among others, local car dealerships Don Judd Dodge (now defunct) and John Chandler Ford (now Tri-State Ford), and furniture retailer Heath Furniture (which would later be purchased by Richmond, Virginia–based Heilig-Meyers in 1997).

=== As a Fox affiliate ===
In the summer of 1986, News Corporation approached Wilson Industries about turning KCIT into a charter affiliate of the Fox Broadcasting Company. Channel 14 joined Fox when the network inaugurated programming on October 9, 1986. Though it was technically a network affiliate, KCIT continued to be programmed as a de facto independent station as Fox's initial programming lineup consisted solely of a late-night talk show, The Late Show Starring Joan Rivers. Even after its programming expanded with the launch of a three-hour Sunday night lineup in April 1987, Fox aired its prime time programming exclusively on weekends until September 1989, when it began a five-year expansion towards a nightly prime time schedule. Until Fox began airing prime time programs on all seven nights of the week in January 1993, KCIT continued to air a movie at 7 p.m. on nights when the network did not offer any programming.

On January 18, 1991, Wilson announced it would sell KCIT to the KCIT Acquisition Co. subsidiary of Wichita Falls-based Epic Broadcasting Corporation – owned by Peter D'Acosta, the Martha Steed Lyne Management Trust, Charles R. Hart and eventual Texas House Representative F. Lanham Lyne Jr. (the latter two of whom owned Wichita Falls Fox affiliate KJTL) – for $2.3 million in cash to be paid upon closing; the sale was approved by the FCC on March 11, 1991. In the summer of 1991, the station retired the "TV-14" branding in favor of identifying exclusively as "Fox 14," a brand that KCIT had been using on an alternating basis since 1988; with the change, the station also implemented a logo similar to that used by KJTL — then Epic's flagship station — that remained in use until 1994. In September 1993, KCIT began maintaining a secondary affiliation with the Prime Time Entertainment Network (PTEN), carrying first-run drama series from the programming service in late night until September 1995.

In October 1994, channel 14 gained a sister station when Epic Broadcasting signed on low-power independent station K65GD (channel 65, now a MyNetworkTV affiliate KCPN-LD on UHF channel 33). In May 1995, Epic Broadcasting sold KCIT, K65GD, KJTL and its Wichita Falls sister station K35BO (now MyNetworkTV affiliate KJBO-LD) to New York City-based Wicks Broadcast Group – then a primarily radio-based broadcasting division of private equity firm The Wicks Group, which intended the purchases to be a stepping stone to build a group of middle-market television stations complementary to its nine existing radio properties – for $14 million; the sale was finalized on August 31, 1995.

On January 6, 1999, Wicks announced that it would sell KCIT and KCPN-LP to Bexley, Ohio–based Mission Broadcasting for $13 million, as part of a four-station transaction that also included KJTL and KJBO-LP. The acquisition of KJTL and KJBO was among the first station acquisitions for Mission (part of a four-station transaction that also involved the purchases of KCIT and KCPN-LP); developed as an arm of its creditor Bastet Broadcasting, the group had formed partnerships with the Nexstar Broadcasting Group and Quorum Broadcasting to operate many of Mission's stations in markets that did not have enough television stations to allow a legal duopoly between two commercial outlets. In the Amarillo market, Boston-based Quorum had announced its intent to acquire KAMR-TV from Wichita Falls-based Cannan Communications the day before the Mission purchase was announced (on January 5), in a $64-million, three-station deal. Quorum took over the operations of KCIT and KCPN on June 1, 1999, under joint sales and shared services agreements with Mission, under which KAMR would handle news production, engineering, security and certain other services as well as handling advertising sales for the two stations.

Even though it was the senior partner in the outsourcing agreement, KAMR subsequently vacated its longtime studio facility on North Polk and Northeast 24th Streets, and relocated its operations seven miles (11 km) south to KCIT/KCPN's Fillmore Street facility. On September 12, 2003, Irving, Texas–based Nexstar Broadcasting Group announced it would acquire the Quorum stations and all of its associated JSA/SSAs for $230 million; when the sale was finalized on December 31, 2003, Mission transferred the SSA involving KCIT and KCPN to Nexstar in conjunction with that group's acquisition of KAMR.

On February 25, 2013, the over-the-air signals of KCIT, KAMR and KCPN were knocked off the air for more than 18 hours as a result of electricity fluctuations that shut off cooling pumps on the stations' transmitter tower off of US 287 during a major blizzard that crippled much of the Texas Panhandle. Snow drifts of up to four feet (1.2 m) prevented station employees from accessing the site until the morning of February 26, in order to restore power to the transmitters. All three stations remained available to Suddenlink systems in the area through a direct fiber feed.

== News operation ==
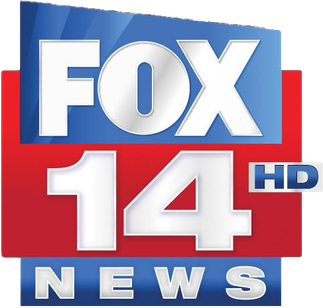
Fox 14 News logo, used since September 2014.

As of May 2021, KAMR-TV produces six hours of locally produced newscasts each week for KCIT (with an hour each weekday, and a half-hour each on Saturdays and Sundays). As the duopoly partner of KAMR, the station may also simulcast long-form severe weather coverage from the NBC affiliate in the event that a tornado warning is issued for any county in its viewing area of the Texas and Oklahoma Panhandles as well as Eastern New Mexico. However, unlike most Fox affiliates, KCIT does not carry a weekday morning newscast.

Local newscasts debuted on channel 14 the day it started operations as KJTV on October 24, 1982, with a half-hour-long 10 p.m. newscast, titled Channel 14 News (later retitled as TV-14 News upon the 1985 callsign switch and then as Fox News in 1986, the station's newscasts were then moved to 9 p.m.). In its early years, the prime time newscast — the first such newscast to debut in the Amarillo market — was paired alongside the syndicated national news program Independent Network News (produced by New York City independent station WPIX, now a CW affiliate). In addition, during the 1980s, channel 14 produced Noonday, a weekday midday public affairs program focusing on community issues affecting Texas Panhandle residents. KCIT shut down its news operation in the fall of 1995, with channel 14's news programming consisting solely of 60-second news and weather updates that aired during commercial breaks within the station's daytime and evening programming for the next four years. The news updates, branded as Fox 14 News, were discontinued in 1999, following the sale of KCIT and KCPN-LP to Mission Broadcasting and the formation of the SSA with NBC affiliate KAMR. For the next two years, the station aired no newscasts or news updates at all.

A news outsourcing agreement was established between KCIT and KAMR two years later, resulting in the return of a nightly prime time newscast to channel 14, which made its debut on March 11, 2001. The half-hour show, titled Fox 14 News @ 9, originated from a secondary news set at KAMR/KCIT/KCPN's facility on South Fillmore Street in downtown Amarillo. Originally co-anchored by Kelly James and Paige Smith (née Cook) on Sundays through Friday nights and Mel Hernandez on Saturdays, the newscast was structured to match the "Fox attitude" in an effort to court younger viewers, incorporating entertainment, health and lifestyle news segments and a fast-paced sports segment (similar in pacing to that of the Headline Sports segment aired at the time by CNN Headline News), alongside a conventional style of news coverage that would appeal to Texas Panhandle viewers.

In May 2003, KCIT became the subject of a defamation lawsuit by Gabriel Brown of Canadian, Texas, in which he accused the station and the United Way of Amarillo and Canyon of falsely identifying him in a story about a domestic abuse claim by Brown's wife, Jennifer Brown, who said Gabriel (whose name was not disclosed in the aired report) beat her when she received services from a United Way agency, which compiled information for a story that aired on the 9 p.m. newscast that March about community resources for abused women without verifying the claims. Jennifer later filed a countersuit against her husband on grounds that the suit was meritless, and sought damages resulting from ten years of spousal abuse. The original lawsuit was dismissed by Potter County District Court Judge Patrick Pirtle on September 23, citing Gabriel's failure to file responses to orders demanding evidence of defamation.

The KAMR-produced newscast would later gain additional prime time news competitors in the 9 p.m. timeslot during the late 2000s: CBS affiliate KFDA-TV launched a prime time newscast for sister independent station KZBZ-LP (now KTXC-LP) in September 2006, which was followed by the launch of a newscast produced by ABC affiliate KVII-TV for CW-affiliated DT2 subchannel in September 2012. In 2005, KAMR began producing a one-hour extension of its weekday morning newscast for KCIT, which was eventually canceled after two years due to poor ratings. On January 15, 2008, the 9 p.m. newscast—which had aired for a half-hour since its debut—was expanded to a one-hour-long broadcast; it would revert to a half-hour in September 2011. In December 2014, KAMR began broadcasting its local newscasts in high definition, becoming the market's second Big Three network affiliate (after CBS affiliate KFDA-TV) to upgrade its newscasts to the format; KCIT's prime time show was included in the upgrade.

== Technical information ==
=== Subchannels ===
The station's digital signal is multiplexed:

Subchannels of KCIT
Channel	Res.	Short name	Programming
14.1	1080i	KCIT-HD	Fox
14.2	480i	Grit	Grit
14.3	480i	IonMyst	Ion Mystery
14.4	480i	Bounce	Bounce TV

=== Analog-to-digital conversion ===
KCIT shut down its analog signal, over UHF channel 14, on February 17, 2009, the original target date on which full-power television stations in the United States were to transition from analog to digital broadcasts under federal mandate (which was later pushed back to June 12, 2009). The station's digital signal remained on its pre-transition UHF channel 15, using virtual channel 14.

=== Translators ===
KCIT covers a large portion of northwestern Texas, the Oklahoma Panhandle and northeastern New Mexico through many translators that distribute its programming beyond the 71.4-mile-wide (114.9 km) range of its broadcast signal:

- K25CQ-D Childress, TX
- K27OG-D Clarendon, TX
- K28PV-D Clovis, NM
- K30FY-D Guymon, OK
- K36CA-D Memphis, TX
- K24NF-D Tucumcari, NM
- K22NO-D Tulia, TX
- K28KV-D Turkey, TX

== See also ==
- Channel 15 digital TV stations in the United States
- Channel 14 virtual TV stations in the United States
