= WMC-TV =

Television station in Memphis, Tennessee

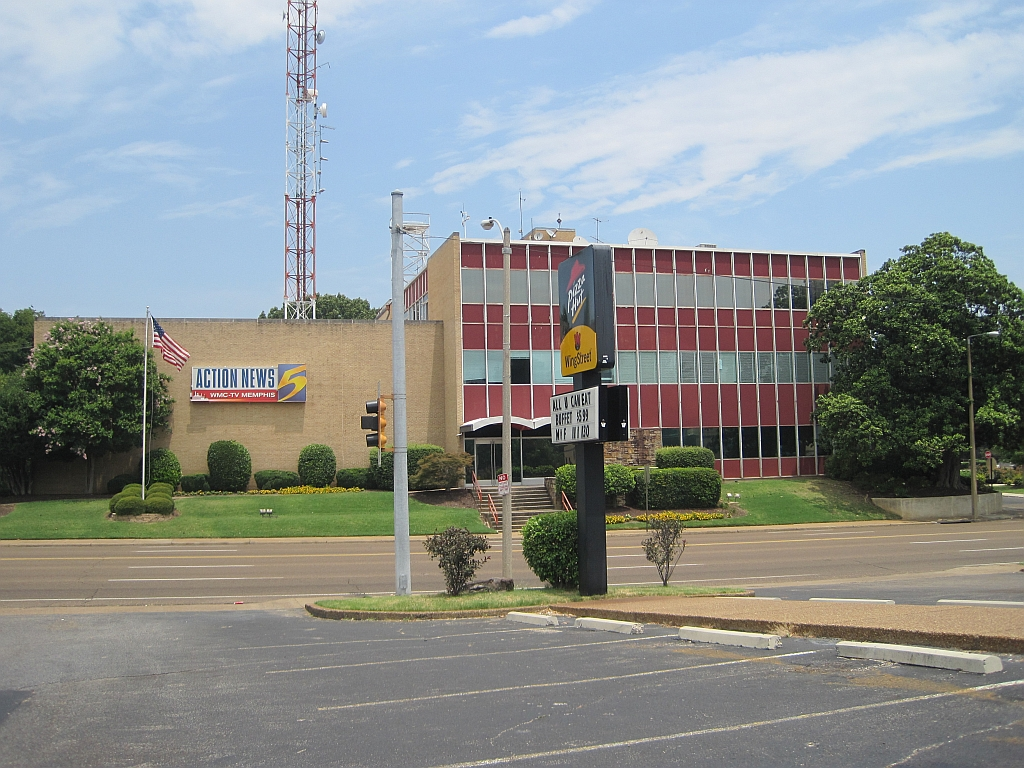
- WMC-TV's current studios and offices at 1960 Union Avenue
- Memphis, Tennessee; United States
- Channels: Digital: 30 (UHF); Virtual: 5
- Branding: WMC-TV 5; Action News 5

Programming
- Affiliations: 5.1: NBC; for others, see § Technical information and subchannels

Ownership
- Owner: Gray Media; (Gray Television Licensee, LLC)
- Sister stations: WTME-LD

History
- First air date: December 11, 1948
- Former call signs: WMCT (1948–1967)
- Former channel numbers: Analog: 4 (VHF, 1948–1952), 5 (VHF, 1952–2009); Digital: 52 (UHF, 1999–2009), 5 (VHF, 2009–2024)
- Former affiliations: All secondary: CBS (1948–1953); ABC (1948–1955); DuMont (1948–1956)
- Call sign meaning: Memphis Commercial Appeal (derived from WMC (AM))

Technical information
- Licensing authority: FCC
- Facility ID: 19184
- ERP: 515 kW
- HAAT: 310.3 m (1,018 ft)
- Transmitter coordinates: 35°10′9″N 89°53′10″W
- Translator(s): see § Translators

Links
- Public license information: Public file; LMS
- Website: www.actionnews5.com

WMC-TV (channel 5) is a television station in Memphis, Tennessee, United States, affiliated with NBC. It is owned by Gray Media alongside low-power Telemundo affiliate WTME-LD (channel 14). The two stations share studios on Union Avenue in midtown Memphis; WMC-TV's transmitter is located in northeast Memphis, near the suburb of Bartlett, Tennessee.

== History ==
The station first signed on the air on December 11, 1948, as WMCT, initially transmitting on VHF channel 4. WMCT was also the first television station in the state of Tennessee. This first transmission coincided with being the first football game telecast in Tennessee—the tenth meeting at Crump Stadium between Tennessee and Ole Miss. Daily programming for WMCT began on December 11, 1948. The station originally broadcast from studios located inside the Goodwyn Institute Building in Downtown Memphis. It was owned by the E. W. Scripps Company, along with the city's morning newspaper, The Commercial Appeal, the afternoon Memphis Press-Scimitar, WMC radio (790 AM), and WMCF (99.7 FM, now WLFP). As the only television station in Memphis for its first several years of operation, WMCT aired programming from all four national networks of the time: NBC, CBS, ABC and the now-defunct DuMont Television Network. However, it carried NBC as a primary affiliation, owing to WMC radio's longtime affiliation with the NBC Red Network. It lost CBS programming when WHBQ-TV (channel 13) signed on in September 1953, but continued to share ABC programming with WHBQ until January 1956, when WREC-TV (channel 3, now WREG-TV) launched as a full-time CBS affiliate with WHBQ taking over the ABC affiliation full-time. It lost DuMont when that network ceased operations in 1956. During the late 1950s, the station was also briefly affiliated with the NTA Film Network. The station moved to VHF channel 5 on November 23, 1952, due to co-channel interference with fellow NBC affiliate WSM-TV in Nashville (now sister station WSMV) also on channel 4; however, this left WMCT shortspaced to another Nashville station, WLAC-TV (now WTVF), when that station signed on in 1954.

The 1967–90 incarnation of WMC-TV's riverboat logo

Since at least the 1950s, WMC-TV's logo has included an illustration of a riverboat, a symbol of the Mississippi River region which the station serves. Since that time, its newscasts have opened with a riverboat whistle; its former AM sister used a whistle as its sounder from the 1930s to the 1990s. The station was known as "The Showplace of the South" during the 1960s. It dropped the "T" from its callsign (simultaneously tacking on the "-TV" suffix to it) on January 1, 1967 (the co-owned FM station had similarly changed its call letters from WMCF to WMC-FM in 1960). Also in 1967, it began using a "5" logo with a resemblance to the numerical typeface found on a five-dollar bill, which would be used for over two decades.

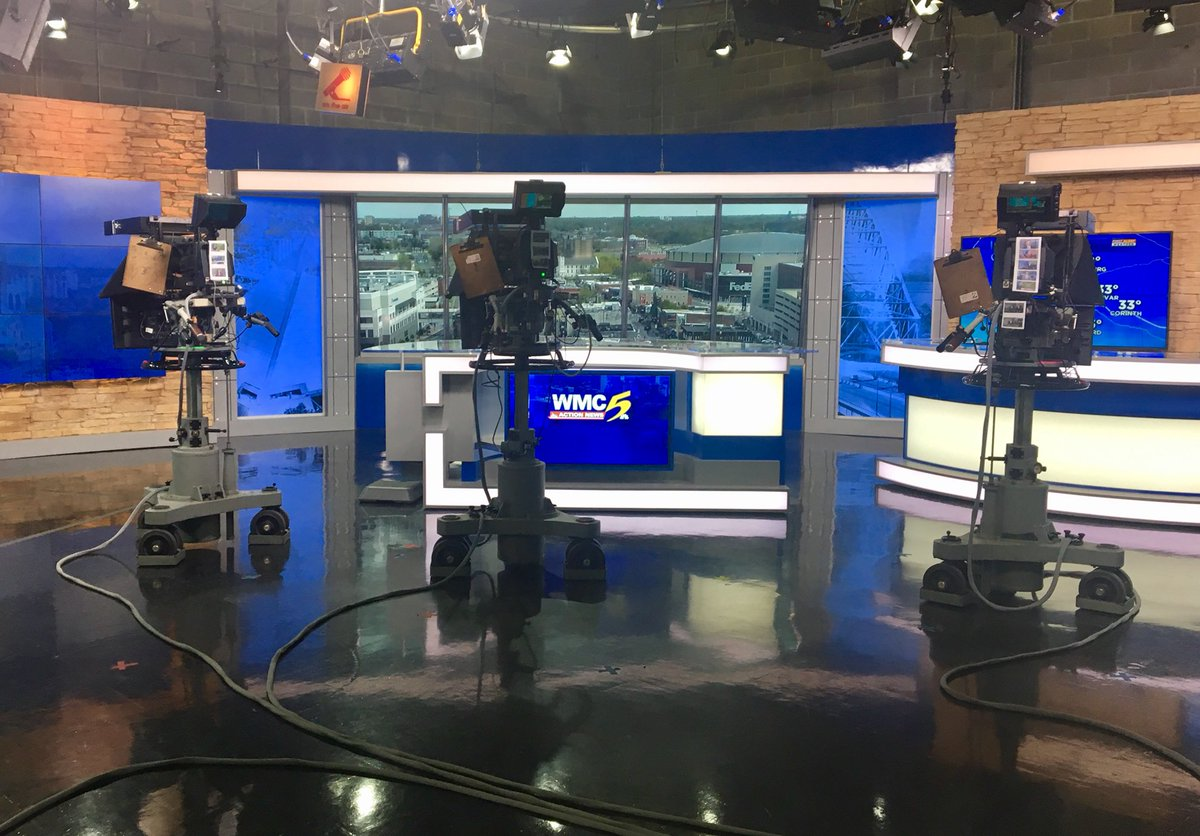
Anchor desk

The WMC stations moved to their current location at 1960 Union Avenue in Midtown Memphis in 1959 and celebrated with a broadcast hosted by comedian George Gobel. In 1960, the stations broadcast live remotes of John F. Kennedy and Richard Nixon, who both came to Memphis to campaign for the presidency. When Martin Luther King Jr. came to Memphis to support the sanitation workers' strike that set the stage for his assassination in 1968, then-station general manager Mori Greiner established an unprecedented program called The 40% Speaks, in an effort to promote racial healing in the community. It was hosted on alternating weeks by Rev. James Lawson, a leader in the civil rights movement and proponent of nonviolent social change, and Rev. Ben Hooks, who went on to become the first Black head of the FCC and then head of the NAACP. That show was the first time Black people had a television platform in Memphis to talk about community issues. The show evolved into Face to Face, which ran for two more decades and regularly addressed issues of race and social justice with multicultural panels and crew members.

After many years of solid management, Scripps sold WMC-AM-FM-TV to Atlanta businessman Bert Ellis and his new company, Ellis Communications, on July 19, 1993, for $65 million-a handsome return on Scripps' original investment in WMC radio in 1923. Ellis was a longtime fan of his hometown's long-dominant station, WSB-TV, and styled his new broadcast group after that station. Under Ellis, channel 5 adopted a blue-and-gold color scheme similar to the one used then as now by WSB-TV. Two of WMC's siblings adopted the logo style as well: KSLA-TV in Shreveport, Louisiana, and WECT in Wilmington, North Carolina. All three stations use modified versions of the same logo style today.

Ellis, in turn, sold the stations to a new broadcasting group formed by the Retirement Systems of Alabama, and subsequently named Raycom Media (that also purchased AFLAC's broadcasting unit), in 1996; Raycom sold off the radio stations to Infinity Broadcasting in 2000. (They are now owned by Audacy.)

On June 25, 2018, Atlanta-based Gray Television announced it had reached an agreement with Raycom to merge their respective broadcasting assets (consisting of Raycom's 63 existing owned-and/or-operated television stations, including WMC-TV), and Gray's 93 television stations) under Gray's corporate umbrella. The cash-and-stock merger transaction valued at $3.6 billion—in which Gray shareholders acquired preferred stock held by Raycom–resulted in WMC-TV gaining new sister stations in nearby markets, including the Knoxville duopoly of CBS affiliate WVLT-TV and CW affiliate WBXX-TV (at the time Gray's only Tennessee properties; also while separating it from WTNZ) and ABC/CW affiliate WTOK-TV in Meridian, Mississippi, in addition to its current Raycom sister stations. The sale was approved on December 20, and was completed on January 2, 2019.

== Programming ==
=== Past program preemptions and deferrals ===
Like many NBC affiliates from the 1960s through the 1990s, WMC-TV began preempting a handful of NBC programs, mostly a sizeable portion of the network's daytime lineup, in favor of syndicated talk shows, although NBC's daytime reruns of sitcoms would often continue to air in the early morning hours (between 5 and 6 a.m.). Although NBC had traditionally been far less tolerant of preemptions than the other networks, it was more than satisfied with WMC-TV, which then as now was one of NBC's strongest affiliates.

=== Local programming ===
In 1979, in an effort to build its viewership for The Today Show, WMC created a lead-in morning program titled Wake-Up Call. For the first three years, it was hosted by longtime WMC personality Dick Hawley and Peggy Rolfes. Denise DuBois replaced Rolfes in 1982 and co-hosted for the next ten years. By the mid-1980s, Wake Up Call was the highest-rated talk show on local television in the U.S., with a 52% share of the viewing audience.

A popular local program on WMC-TV was Magicland, a live-audience magic series for children, hosted by anchor/announcer Dick "Mr. Magic" Williams, which aired Sunday mornings at 10 a.m. from 1966 until Williams' retirement in 1989. It is cited in the Guinness Book of World Records as the longest-running magic series in television history, having amassed 1,200 original episodes in its 23-year run. Williams died in 2020 at the age of 92.

=== Sports programming ===
One of the station's first broadcasts was a football game at Crump Stadium in Memphis. WMCT first broadcast what was then known simply as Championship Wrestling (later to become USWA Championship Wrestling in 1989) by stringing cables across the street from its studio to the since-demolished Ellis Auditorium in downtown Memphis early in the 1950s. Wrestling returned to Channel 5 in 1977, after several years on WHBQ-TV, and for many years the very popular live in-studio professional wrestling program was broadcast live on Saturdays from 10 a.m. to 11:30 am. Some of the wrestlers became regional celebrities from their exposure on the program, including Jerry "The King" Lawler, whose fame earned him his own locally produced Sunday sports program on channel 5 during the 1980s. USWA Championship Wrestling eventually became the last remaining program of its kind in the U.S., before its cancellation in 1997. The station still airs professional wrestling programming in the form of Memphis Wrestling owned by Dustin Starr. Long before national PGA Tour broadcasts began, WMC-TV broadcast live professional golf from the Memphis Open, with a three-camera remote truck providing coverage from three greens.

In 2025, WMC reached an agreement with the Memphis Grizzlies to simulcast five games with FanDuel Sports Network Southeast during the 2024–25 season. The station will also air select Grizzlies games through NBC's NBA coverage starting in the 2025–26 season. WMC also reached a 19-game agreement with the Memphis Redbirds, the Triple-A affiliate of the St. Louis Cardinals.

=== News operation ===
WMC-TV's Action News 5 logo

WMC-TV presently broadcasts 44 hours of locally produced newscasts each week (with seven hours each weekday, and 4 1/2 hours each on Saturdays and Sundays). The station's newsroom is named after longtime employee Ed Greaney, who died on June 19, 2005. Greaney started working at WMCT in 1949, only two months after the station signed on and worked at channel 5 until retiring in late 2000.

Appropriately for a station founded by a newspaper, WMC-TV has a strong local news tradition. For the better part of its first four decades on the air, it was the dominant station in Memphis. However, rival WREG closed the gap in the late 1980s, and for the next two decades the two stations waged a spirited battle in the Nielsen ratings. WREG would not overtake WMC until the February 2006 sweeps period with the appointment of former WHBQ anchor Claudia Barr and former WMC morning anchor Richard Ransom as its evening anchors. Since that time, WREG has beaten WMC in the mornings, at 10 p.m. and on weekends. For the May 2013 sweeps period, WREG's newscasts beat WMC's in most timeslots (except at 5 and 6 pm), while WMC beat WREG in the 6 p.m. timeslot by .3 of a point. During the February 2014 sweeps, WMC fell to second place in all timeslots, trailing WREG by several points.

In October 2006, WMC debuted an overhauled news set (the first set update since 1995), along with an updated graphics and music package. On July 2, 2008, WMC-TV became the first television station in the Memphis market and the second in Tennessee (behind WTVF in Nashville) to begin broadcasting its local newscasts in high definition.

On August 22, 2011, WMC-TV debuted an hour-long 4 p.m. newscast, which replaced The Oprah Winfrey Show (which ended its run in May of that year) and competes against WREG's newscast in the same timeslot. On June 26, 2013, WMC-TV debuted an hour-long weekday morning newscast from 7–8 a.m. on its Bounce TV-affiliated second digital subchannel with a heavy emphasis on weather and traffic updates. The 7–8 a.m. Bounce newscast ended in 2017. On September 10, 2018, WMC-TV expanded its weekday morning newscast with an extra half-hour starting at 4 a.m.

==== Notable former on-air staff ====
- Dave Brown – chief meteorologist, hosted Championship Wrestling (1977–2015)
- Jovita Moore – reporter, to 1998
- Lance Russell – freelance host; best known as the host of the live Championship Wrestling program on Saturday mornings (joined the station in 1977 from WHBQ-TV)
- Dick Williams – host of Magicland (1966–1989)

== Technical information and subchannels ==
WMC-TV's transmitter is located in northeast Memphis, near the suburb of Bartlett, Tennessee. The station's signal is multiplexed:

Subchannels of WMC-TV
Subchannel	Res.	Short name	Programming
5.1	1080i	WMCNBC	NBC
5.2	480i	Bounce	Bounce TV (4:3)
5.3	1080i	MSEN	Midsouth SEN
5.4	480i	Oxygen	Oxygen
5.5	480i	THE365	365BLK
5.6	480i	DEFY	Defy

=== Analog-to-digital conversion ===
WMC-TV ended regular programming on its analog signal, over VHF channel 5, at 12:01 a.m. on June 12, 2009, as part of the federally mandated transition from analog to digital television. The station's digital signal relocated from its pre-transition UHF channel 52, which was among the high band UHF channels (52–69) that were removed from broadcasting use as a result of the transition, to its analog-era VHF channel 5 for post-transition operations.

On January 9, 2023, WMC was given FCC approval to move from VHF channel 5 to UHF channel 30 to address reception concerns; the station switched to the new UHF signal on December 3, 2024.

=== Translators ===
WMC-TV has three low-power translators, which were set up by Gray to reduce the loss area in the station's conversion from VHF channel 5 to UHF channel 30.

- WDDY-LD 15 Corinth, MS
- W20DW-D Clarksdale, MS
- WANF-LD 32 Dyersburg, TN

== Out-of-market coverage ==
WMC-TV was historically the default NBC affiliate on cable and over-the-air in two neighboring media markets—Jackson, Tennessee, and Jonesboro, Arkansas, as NBC never affiliated with any stations in either of these markets. In 2014, WNBJ-LD (channel 39) signed on the air as the Jackson area's own NBC affiliate. To the present day, WMC-TV remains intact on the area's cable system of the Jackson Energy Authority; that system also carried Nashville's WSMV until the sign-on of WNBJ.

In late January 2015, WMC's ABC-affiliated sister station KAIT (channel 8) in Jonesboro converted their second subchannel, KAIT-DT2, into an NBC affiliate for the Jonesboro market. In addition, WMC-TV's over-the-air signal still provides city-grade coverage into both Jonesboro and Jackson. The central and southern portions of the two southernmost counties in the Missouri Bootheel can also still pick up WMC-TV's signal.

== See also ==
- List of three-letter broadcast call signs in the United States
