= KCPN-LD =

Television station in Amarillo, Texas

- Amarillo, Texas; United States
- Channels: Digital: 33 (UHF); Virtual: 33
- Branding: MyAmarilloTV

Programming
- Affiliations: 33.1: Independent with MyNetworkTV; 33.2: Rewind TV

Ownership
- Owner: Nexstar Media Group; (Nexstar Media Inc.)
- Sister stations: KAMR-TV, KCIT

History
- First air date: October 26, 1994
- Former call signs: K65GD (1994–1997); KCPN-LP (1997–2021)
- Former channel numbers: Analog: 65 (UHF, 1994–2001), 33 (UHF, 2001–2021)
- Former affiliations: Independent (1994–1995, 2002–2006); UPN (1995–2002)
- Call sign meaning: Combination of KCIT (sister station) and UPN (former network affiliation)

Technical information
- Facility ID: 7739
- Class: LD
- ERP: 15 kW
- HAAT: 177.3 m (582 ft)
- Transmitter coordinates: 35°20′33.1″N 101°49′21.2″W
- Translator(s): KAMR-TV 4.2 Amarillo

Links
- Website: www.myhighplains.com

KCPN-LD (channel 33) is a low-power television station in Amarillo, Texas, United States. It is primarily programmed as an independent station, but maintains a secondary affiliation with MyNetworkTV. KCPN-LD is owned by Nexstar Media Group alongside NBC affiliate KAMR-TV (channel 4) and co-managed with Fox affiliate KCIT (channel 14). The three stations share studios on Southeast 11th Avenue and South Fillmore Street in downtown Amarillo; KCPN-LD's transmitter is located on Dumas Drive (US 87–287) and Reclamation Plant Road in rural unincorporated Potter County.

Due to the station's low-power status, its signal contour is limited to the immediate Amarillo area, the nearby suburb of Bishop Hills and certain adjoining areas of Potter and Randall counties. Therefore, in order to reach the entire market, KCPN-LD is simulcast on KAMR-TV's second digital subchannel (4.2) from the same transmitter site. Ever since its inception, the KAMR-DT2 simulcast of this station had been presented in 480i standard definition, with most programs (including the MyNetworkTV prime time schedule) airing in letterboxed 4:3; however, around September 2017, it had been upgraded into 1080i full high definition.

== History ==
=== Early history ===
The station first signed on the air on October 26, 1994, as K65GD, which originally transmitted on UHF channel 65. The station was founded by the Epic Broadcasting Corporation, then owner of KCIT. Operating as an independent station, it carried a mix of first-run and off-network syndicated programming, feature films and animated series.

On January 16, 1995, the station became a charter affiliate of the United Paramount Network (UPN), which was created as a partnership between Paramount Television and Chris-Craft/United Television. Outside of UPN prime time programming, the station otherwise continued to maintain a general entertainment programming format. Alongside UPN prime time programming, channel 65 initially carried some recent off-network sitcoms and drama series, movies on weekend afternoons and evenings, children's programming, and some first-run syndicated shows. That same year, Epic sold K65GD, KCIT and sister stations KJTL and KJBO-LP in Wichita Falls to the Wicks Broadcast Group. On November 21, 1997, the station adopted a conventional callsign as KCPN-LP (a combination of the calls of sister station KCIT and its affiliation with UPN), at which time, the station had also moved to UHF channel 33.

On January 6, 1999, Wicks announced that it would sell KCPN-LP and KCIT to Mission Broadcasting for $13 million. The day before the Mission Broadcasting purchase announcement, on January 5, Boston-based Quorum Broadcasting announced that it would purchase KAMR-TV from Cannan Communications as part of a $64-million, three-station deal). The acquisition of KCIT and KCPN was among the first station acquisitions for Mission, which originated as an arm of its creditor Bastet Broadcasting; the Bexley, Ohio–based group had formed partnerships with the Nexstar Broadcasting Group and Quorum to operate many of Mission's stations in markets that did not have enough television stations to allow a legal duopoly between two commercial broadcast outlets. Quorum took over the operations of KCIT and KCPN on June 1, 1999, under joint sales and shared services agreements with Mission, under which KAMR would handle news production, engineering, security and certain other services as well as handling advertising sales for the two stations. KAMR subsequently vacated its longtime studio facility on North Polk and Northeast 24th Streets, and relocated its operations seven miles (11 km) south to KCIT/KCPN's Fillmore Street facility.

KCPN disaffiliated from UPN on September 16, 2002, after the network reached an affiliation agreement with Drewry Communications to carry its programming on KZBZ-LP (channel 46, later KTXC-LP). The affiliation switch occurred two weeks after the September 1 launch of KFDA's digital television signal (the first television station to begin digital broadcasting operations in the Amarillo market), which began carrying a simulcast of KZBZ on virtual channel 10.3; KFDA also reached an agreement with Cox Communications (its Amarillo service area is now served by Suddenlink Communications) to carry the low-powered KZBZ on channel 6 to avoid disrupting access to UPN programming in the market. KCPN replaced UPN network programming with a mix of off-network syndicated programming during prime time. On September 12, 2003, Quorum merged with Irving, Texas–based Nexstar Broadcasting Group for $230 million; when the sale was finalized on December 31, 2003, Mission transferred the SSA involving KCIT and KCPN to Nexstar as a consequence of its acquisition of KAMR.

=== As a MyNetworkTV affiliate ===
On January 24, 2006, the respective parent companies of UPN and The WB, CBS Corporation and the Warner Bros. Entertainment division of Time Warner, announced that they would dissolve the two networks to create The CW Television Network, a joint venture between the two media companies that initially featured programs from its two predecessor networks as well as new series specifically produced for The CW. Subsequently, on February 22, 2006, News Corporation announced the launch of MyNetworkTV, a network operated by Fox Television Stations and its syndication division Twentieth Television that was created to primarily to provide network programming to UPN and WB stations that The CW decided against affiliating based on their local viewership standing in comparison to the outlet that The CW ultimately chose as its charter outlets, giving these stations another option besides converting to a general entertainment independent format.

On March 30, in a joint announcement by the network and Nexstar Broadcasting Group/Mission Broadcasting, KCPN-LP was confirmed as MyNetworkTV's charter affiliate for the Amarillo market. Channel 33 officially joined MyNetworkTV upon that network's launch on September 5; however, KCPN-LP changed its on-air branding to "My Amarillo TV" in advance of the switch in late August. As a result of the network changes, "KDBA", a cable-only affiliate of The WB (through its small-market network feed, The WB 100+ Station Group) available in the market on area systems such as Suddenlink Communications, was expected to affiliate with The CW; however, as a result of a deal between the network and Barrington Broadcasting that was announced on April 10, 2006, the CW affiliation instead went to ABC affiliate KVII-TV (channel 7) – which launched a digital subchannel affiliated with the network's small-market feed, The CW Plus, when the network debuted on September 18, assuming the operations of "KDBA".

On February 25, 2013, the over-the-air signals of KCIT, KAMR and KCPN were knocked off the air for more than 18 hours as a result of electricity fluctuations that shut off cooling pumps on the stations' transmitter tower off of U.S. 287 during a major blizzard that crippled much of the Texas Panhandle. Snow drifts of up to 4 feet (1.2 m) prevented station employees from accessing the site until the morning of February 26, in order to restore power to the transmitters. All three stations remained available to Suddenlink Communications systems in the area through a direct fiber feed.

In July 2021, Nexstar exercised its option to acquire KCPN-LD outright from Mission. The transaction was completed on October 1.

== Technical information ==
=== Subchannels ===
The station's signal is multiplexed:

Subchannels of KCPN-LD
Channel	Res.	Short name	Programming
33.1	1080i	KCPN-LD	Main KCPN-LD programming
33.2	480i		Rewind TV (4:3)

=== Analog-to-digital conversion ===
The station flash-cut to digital on April 1, 2021, taking the callsign KCPN-LD.
