= Dick Williams (magician) =

American magician (1927–2020)

Dick Williams (17 July 1927 – 10 July 2020) was a television and radio presenter and magician who holds the Guinness World Record for hosting the longest-running television magic show in the world. Under the name "Mr. Magic" he presented the show Magicland on WMC-TV in Memphis, Tennessee, from 1966 until his retirement in 1989. Dick performed tricks and illusions, juggled clubs and scarves, and is often remembered for his signature magician's finger exercises.

== Life and career ==
Williams was born on 17 July 1927. He spent his early life in Kansas and began learning magic at the age of seven from a "Gilbert" magic set, which he had received as a Christmas present. He remained so keen on magic and became so proficient that his local magic club, the "Wizards of Wichita", later made an exception to its minimum age rule and allowed him to join when he was 13 rather than the usual lower limit of 18. During the second world war he performed with the club at military bases. He joined the US Navy in 1945 and served on the battleship USS West Virginia.

He began his broadcasting career at the age of 17, when he won a voice contest and got a job as an announcer with a local radio station, KAKE. He worked there several years before transferring to KEDD-TV in 1955. Prior to that, in 1950, Dick received his B.A. in Liberal Arts (major: Political Science) from Wichita State University. In the 1950s, Dick (and wife, Virginia) moved to Amarillo, Texas. Dick was a TV weatherman and performed over 300 magic shows on KGNC-TV, now KAMR-TV/NBC affiliate, in Amarillo, TX.

In 1965, Williams joined WMC-TV, the NBC affiliate in Memphis, Tennessee, as a staff announcer and weatherman (over 7000 weathercasts by 1989). After hearing about his magic show in Texas, the WMC-TV management also asked him if he would start a similar show in Memphis. He agreed on the basis that he thought the show would run for about a year. Magicland was a weekly half-hour live-audience magic series for children and first aired on WMC-TV in 1966. Against Williams' expectations, the show remained popular for 23 years until his retirement in 1989. In total, 1200 episodes were produced. Magicland is also referenced on this Wikipedia page: List of local children's television series (United States).

Guest stars on Magicland included Harmon Baker, Blackstone Jr., Zaney Blaney, Ali Bongo, John Booth, John Calvert, Ricki Dunn, Frank Everhart, David Ginn, Mercer Helms, George Johnstone, Bob & Nikki Kenney, Jay Marshall, The Memphis Magicians, Charlie Miller, Tom Ogden, Col. Seymour, Ben Small, Joe White, and Mark Wilson (source: Who's Who in Magic by Whaley).

Williams was featured in the 2005 Guinness World Records book on p. 182 in a "Magic & Illusions" section as well as p. 154 in the 2006 book for having the longest-running magic show in television history, with 1200 broadcasts (1500 TV shows total, if his Texas shows are included). He was the first to perform the Zig-Zag illusion on American TV (April 4, 1971). He was a member of the International Brotherhood of Magician's Order of Merlin - Excelsior (60 years of membership - awarded 2015). Dick was a past member of Society of American Magicians and received a SAM Presidential Citation on April 26, 2018...describing his many years of performing on television, dedication to the art, and mentoring magicians.

Williams was assisted for much of his career by his wife Virginia, who was a coloratura soprano and music teacher by profession. As well as acting as an onstage magician's assistant, she sewed costumes, organized props, arranged music and directed other assistants. Virginia died from Alzheimer's disease on January 1, 2007, after 57 years of marriage. She was about one month shy of her 87th birthday. Virginia was predeceased by the couple's only child, Sherry.

Dick "Mr. Magic" Williams turned 92 on July 17, 2019. He died on July 10, 2020, at the age of 92.

== Other sources ==
- Tanner, Beccy, "Local magician's listing in Guinness is no illusion", The Wichita Eagle, 25 August 2004
- LeClaire, Margerette, "News from the Pres.", Society of Memphis Magicians newsletter, April 2007.
