= KJBO-LD =

Television station in Wichita Falls, Texas

- Wichita Falls, Texas; Lawton, Oklahoma; United States
- City: Wichita Falls, Texas
- Channels: Digital: 35 (UHF); Virtual: 35
- Branding: KJBO

Programming
- Affiliations: Independent with MyNetworkTV

Ownership
- Owner: Nexstar Media Group; (Nexstar Media Inc.)
- Sister stations: KFDX-TV, KJTL

History
- First air date: July 1, 1988
- Former call signs: K35BO (1988–1996); KJBO-LP (1996–2021)
- Former channel number: Analog: 35 (UHF, 1986–2021)
- Former affiliations: Independent, sports (1988–1996); UPN (1996–2006)
- Call sign meaning: Derived from KJTL and former K35BO call sign

Technical information
- Licensing authority: FCC
- Facility ID: 7670
- Class: LD
- ERP: 10.5 kW
- HAAT: 125.4 m (411 ft)
- Transmitter coordinates: 33°53′51″N 98°32′33″W
- Translator(s): KFDX-TV 3.2 Wichita Falls

Links
- Public license information: LMS
- Website: www.texomashomepage.com

KJBO-LD (channel 35) is a low-power television station in Wichita Falls, Texas, United States. It is programmed primarily as an independent station, but maintains a secondary affiliation with MyNetworkTV. KJBO-LD is owned by Nexstar Media Group alongside NBC/CW+ affiliate KFDX-TV (channel 3) and co-managed with Fox affiliate KJTL (channel 18). The three stations share studios near Seymour Highway (US 277) and Turtle Creek Road in Wichita Falls; KJBO-LD's transmitter is located near Arrowhead Drive and Onaway Trail (near Seymour Highway) southwest of the city.

Although KJBO-LD broadcasts a digital signal of its own, due to its low-power status, the station's broadcasting radius does not reach the entire Wichita Falls–Lawton market. Therefore, KJBO-LD is simulcast on KFDX-TV's second digital subchannel (3.2)—which also transmits from the Seymour Highway facility—in order to reach Lawton and surrounding areas of southwestern Oklahoma and northwest Texas not covered by the channel 35 signal. Ever since its inception, the KFDX-DT2 simulcast of KJBO-LP/LD had been presented in 480i standard definition, with most programs (including the MyNetworkTV prime time schedule) airing in letterboxed 4:3; however, sometime in 2020, it was upgraded to 1080i high definition.

== History ==
=== Early history ===
The station first signed on the air on July 1, 1988, as K35BO, which originally operated as an independent station. It was known as Sports 35 and broadcast sports programming including Houston Astros and Texas Rangers games, also airing part-time on local cable. It was the sister station to Fox affiliate KJTL (channel 18) and shared its sports inventory with that station. By 1992, the channel was known as Fox Sports Net—years before the Fox Sports Net name was used nationally. In addition to local sports, it aired programming from the Prime Sports network.

In May 1995, Epic announced it would sell KJTL and K35BO as well as the Amarillo duopoly of fellow Fox affiliate KCIT and low-powered K65GD (now MyNetworkTV affiliate KCPN-LD) to New York City–based Wicks Broadcast Group—then a primarily radio-based broadcasting division of private equity firm The Wicks Group, which intended the purchases to be a stepping stone to build a group of middle-market television stations complementary to its nine existing radio properties—for $14 million; the sale was finalized on August 31, 1995.

=== UPN affiliation; JSA/SSA with KFDX-TV ===
KJBO's final logo as a UPN affiliate, used from September 2002 to September 2006.

On March 3, 1996, KJTL converted K35BO from a sports channel into a UPN affiliate, branded UPN 35, with a general-entertainment lineup. Previously, KJTL had been airing UPN programs under a secondary affiliation. The change was necessary after Fox acquired Prime Sports parent Liberty Media. As a result, Fox rescinded the approval previously given to the station to air Prime Sports programming, provided as a pay cable channel elsewhere in the U.S., on an over-the-air broadcast station. Later in 1996, it became KJBO-LP.

Wicks began seeking buyers for its stations in 1998, citing an inability to compete in an increasingly consolidated landscape. Mission Broadcasting acquired the Wichita Falls operation (for $15.5 million) and KCIT-TV in Amarillo (for $13 million). Previously, a related company, Nexstar Broadcasting Group, had acquired Wichita Falls–based NBC affiliate KFDX-TV. Nexstar took over the operations of KJTL and KJBO on June 1, 1999, under joint sales and shared services agreements with Mission, under which KFDX would handle news production, engineering, security and certain other services as well as handling advertising sales for the two stations. KJTL and KJBO subsequently vacated their shared facility on Call Field Road and relocated its operations two miles (3.2 km) southeast to KFDX's studio facility on Seymour Highway and Turtle Creek Road.

=== As a MyNetworkTV affiliate ===
KJBO-LP logo, used from September 2006 to September 2014.

On January 24, 2006, the respective parent companies of UPN and The WB, CBS Corporation and the Warner Bros. Entertainment division of Time Warner, announced that they would dissolve the two networks to create The CW Television Network, a joint venture between the two media companies that initially featured programs from its two predecessor networks as well as new series specifically produced for The CW. Subsequently, on February 22, 2006, News Corporation announced the launch of MyNetworkTV, a network operated by Fox Television Stations and its syndication division Twentieth Television that was created to primarily to provide network programming to UPN and WB stations that The CW decided against affiliating based on their local viewership standing in comparison to the outlet that The CW ultimately chose as its charter outlets, giving these stations another option besides converting to a general entertainment independent format. On March 30, in a joint announcement by the network and Nexstar Broadcasting Group/Mission Broadcasting, KJBO-LP was confirmed as MyNetworkTV's charter affiliate for the Wichita Falls-Lawton market. KJBO remained a UPN affiliate until September 4, 2006, with the network's Sunday late-night repeat block as the final UPN offering to be carried on the station. Channel 35 officially joined MyNetworkTV upon that network's launch on September 5, at which point KJBO changed its branding to "MyTV KJBO".

As a result of the network changes, "KWB", a cable-only affiliate of The WB (through its small-market network feed, The WB 100+ Station Group) available in the market on systems such as Fidelity Cablevision in Lawton and Time Warner Cable in Wichita Falls, was expected to affiliate with The CW; however, as a result of a deal between the network and Hoak Media that was announced on April 10, 2006, the CW affiliation instead went to CBS affiliate KAUZ-TV (channel 6)—which launched a digital subchannel affiliated with the network's small-market feed, The CW Plus, when the network debuted on September 17, assuming the operations of "KWB".

On March 26, 2021, the station flash-cut to digital and became KJBO-LD.

In July 2021, Nexstar exercised its option to acquire KJBO-LD outright from Mission. The transaction was completed on October 1.

== Subchannel ==
Subchannel of KJBO-LD
Channel	Res.	Short name	Programming
35.1	1080i	KJBO-LD	Main KJBO-LD programming
