= Channel 14 virtual TV stations in the United States =

The following television stations operate on virtual channel 14 in the United States:

- K05JU-D in Elko, Nevada
- K06QS-D in Salina & Redmond, Utah
- K12QQ-D in Cedar City, Utah
- K12QS-D in Mink Creek, Idaho
- K12XE-D in Woodland, Utah
- K13NZ-D in Shoshoni, Wyoming
- K13AAD-D in Long Valley Junction, Utah
- K13AAO-D in Helper, Utah
- K14JS-D in Cortez, etc., Colorado
- K14LP-D in Cottage Grove, Oregon
- K14NR-D in Tyler, Texas
- K14PX-D in Paxico, Kansas
- K14QG-D in Alamogordo, New Mexico
- K14RB-D in St. Paul, Minnesota
- K14SH-D in Marshfield, Missouri
- K14TK-D in Santa Maria, California
- K15LE-D in Heber City, Utah
- K16AE-D in Gillette, Wyoming
- K16MP-D in Bluff & area, Utah
- K17DM-D in Myton, Utah
- K18DL-D in Logan, Utah
- K18JA-D in Pinedale, Wyoming
- K18KG-D in Spencer, Iowa
- K19DU-D in Summit County, Utah
- K19EW-D in Preston, Idaho
- K19FZ-D in Elko, Nevada
- K19LR-D in Huntsville, etc., Utah
- K20MT-D in Mount Pleasant, Utah
- K20NA-D in Hatch, Utah
- K20NB-D in Circleville, Utah
- K20NV-D in Fruitland, Utah
- K20OB-D in Nephi, Utah
- K21EZ-D in Price, Utah
- K21HH-D in Preston, Idaho
- K21IU-D in Navajo Mtn. Sch., etc., Utah
- K21IV-D in Oljeto, Utah
- K21IW-D in Mexican Hat, Utah
- K21MY-D in Richfield, etc., Utah
- K21MZ-D in Koosharem, Utah
- K21NA-D in Bicknell & Teasdale, Utah
- K21NB-D in Rural Sevier County, Utah
- K21NC-D in Henrieville, Utah
- K21ND-D in Mayfield, Utah
- K21NE-D in Panguitch, Utah
- K22GW-D in Wells, Nevada
- K22JG-D in Green River, Utah
- K22MM-D in Garfield County, Utah
- K22NF-D in Orangeville, Utah
- K22NO-D in Tulia, Texas
- K23DV-D in Beryl/Modena/New, Utah
- K23PU-D in Norfolk, Nebraska
- K24MZ-D in Fillmore, etc., Utah
- K24NC-D in Roosevelt, Utah
- K24NF-D in Tucumcari, New Mexico
- K25CK-D in Montpelier, Idaho
- K25CQ-D in Childress, Texas
- K25GS-D in Manti and Ephraim, Utah
- K25IP-D in Malad City, Idaho
- K25OZ-D in East Price, Utah
- K26EA-D in Milford, etc., Utah
- K26NW-D in Marysvale, Utah
- K27IS-D in Emery, Utah
- K27KC-D in Ferron, Utah
- K27KE-D in Huntington, Utah
- K27NO-D in Vernal, Utah
- K27OG-D in Clarendon, Texas
- K28KM-D in Clareton, Wyoming
- K28KV-D in Turkey, Texas
- K28PK-D in Scofield, Utah
- K28PV-D in Clovis, New Mexico
- K29II-D in Park City, Utah
- K29MB-D in Antimony, Utah
- K29MS-D in Green River, Utah
- K29MW-D in Duchesne, Utah
- K29MX-D in Manila, etc, Utah
- K30FY-D in Guymon, Oklahoma
- K30GA-D in Garfield County, Utah
- K30GV-D in Shoshoni, Wyoming
- K30KC-D in Samak, Utah
- K30MX-D in Wyodak, Wyoming
- K30PQ-D in Clear Creek, Utah
- K31JE-D in Escalante, Texas
- K31KC-D in Coalville & adjacent area, Utah
- K31LH-D in Fishlake Resort, Utah
- K31NX-D in Fountain Green, Utah
- K31OG-D in Parowan, Enoch, etc., Utah
- K31PJ-D in Holbrook, Idaho
- K32JI-D in Emery, Utah
- K32JN-D in Big Piney, etc., Wyoming
- K32LX-D in Soda Springs, Idaho
- K32MX-D in Randolph & Woodruff, Utah
- K33EB-D in Cedar Canyon, Utah
- K33HX-D in Tropic & Cannonville, Utah
- K34FO-D in Alton, Utah
- K34NA-D in Tampico, Montana
- K34OQ-D in Beaver etc., Utah
- K34OV-D in Washington, etc., Utah
- K35NC-D in Hanksville, Utah
- K35NL-D in Boulder, Utah
- K35NM-D in Caineville, Utah
- K35NO-D in Blanding/Monticello, Utah
- K35NP-D in Kanarraville, New Harmony, Utah
- K36CA-D in Memphis, Texas
- K36IK-D in Delta/Oak City, etc., Utah
- K36JW-D in Spring Glen, Utah
- K36OC-D in Fort Peck, Montana
- K36OH-D in Fremont, Utah
- K36OW-D in Henefer & Echo, Utah
- K42DZ-D in Battle Mountain, Nevada
- K50GA-D in Laketown, etc., Utah
- KAOM-LD in Sweetwater, Texas
- KARD in West Monroe, Louisiana
- KBVO in Llano, Texas
- KBVO-CD in Austin, Texas
- KCEC in Boulder, Colorado
- KCIT in Amarillo, Texas
- KDTV-DT in San Francisco, California
- KEKE in Hilo, Hawaii
- KETH-TV in Houston, Texas
- KFAM-CD in Lake Charles, Louisiana
- KFJX in Pittsburg, Kansas
- KFOX-TV in El Paso, Texas
- KGWC-TV in Casper, Wyoming
- KIBN-LD in Lufkin, Texas
- KINV-LD in Billings, Montana
- KJDA-LD in Sherman, Texas
- KJZZ-TV in Salt Lake City, Utah
- KLAF-LD in Lafayette, Louisiana
- KLNL-LD in College Station, Texas
- KLUZ-TV in Albuquerque, New Mexico
- KMCY in Minot, North Dakota
- KMEG in Sioux City, Iowa
- KMYL-LD in Lubbock, Texas
- KNRC-LD in Sparks, Nevada
- KPBN-LD in Baton Rouge, Louisiana
- KPHS-LD in Lovelock, Nevada
- KPOM-CD in Ontario, California
- KSVT-LD in Twin Falls, Idaho
- KTBO-TV in Oklahoma City, Oklahoma
- KTGM in Tamuning, Guam
- KUDF-LP in Tucson, Arizona
- KVIQ-LD in Eureka, California
- KWHE in Honolulu, Hawaii
- KWNL-CD in Winslow, Arkansas
- KXAP-LD in Tulsa, Oklahoma
- KXBF-LD in Bakersfield, California
- W14CX-D in Knoxville, Tennessee
- W14DA-D in Harpswell, Maine
- W14DK-D in Dagsboro, Delaware
- W14EE-D in Algood, Tennessee
- W26EV-D in Portsmouth, Virginia
- W33DH-D in Eau Claire, Wisconsin
- WABW-TV in Pelham, Georgia
- WCMU-TV in Mount Pleasant, Michigan
- WCWF in Suring, Wisconsin
- WDMR-LD in Springfield, Massachusetts
- WDYB-CD in Daytona Beach, Florida
- WEBA-TV in Allendale, South Carolina
- WECX-LD in Eau Claire, Wisconsin
- WFDC-DT in Arlington, Virginia
- WFIE in Evansville, Indiana
- WIIW-LD in Nashville, Tennessee
- WMAW-TV in Meridian, Mississippi
- WNDT-CD in Manhattan, New York
- WOBC-CD in Battle Creek, Michigan
- WOST in Mayaguez, Puerto Rico
- WPDS-LD in Largo, etc., Florida
- WPTO in Oxford, Ohio
- WPXA-TV in Rome, Georgia
- WQQZ-CD in Ponce, Puerto Rico
- WSCG-LD in Beaufort, etc., South Carolina
- WSEC in Jacksonville, Illinois
- WTBZ-LD in Gainesville, Florida
- WWJS in Hickory, North Carolina
- WXIV-LD in Myrtle Beach, South Carolina
- WXSL-LD in St. Elmo, Illinois
- WYBN-LD in Cobleskill, New York
- WYDO in Greenville, North Carolina

The following stations, which are no longer licensed, formerly operated on virtual channel 14:

- K17LB-D in Perryton, Texas
- K22EC-D in Juab, Utah
- K27BZ-D in Wellington, Texas
- K31CD-D in Canadian, Texas
- K40DD-D in Gruver, Texas
- K43NU-D in Follett, Texas
- K45DY-D in New Mobeetie, Texas
- K50DY-D in Capulin, etc., New Mexico
- KBBA-LD in Cedar Falls, Iowa
- KOIB-LD in Columbia, Missouri
- KQPS-LD in Hot Springs, Arkansas
- KRHP-LD in The Dalles, Oregon
- KZDE-LD in Fort Collins, Colorado
- W14DJ-D in Myrtle Beach, South Carolina
- WAZH-CD in Harrisonburg, Virginia
- WDLF-LD in Peoria, Illinois
- WMEI in Arecibo, Puerto Rico
- WNWE-LD in Lincoln, Nebraska
- WPDZ-LD in Buxton, North Carolina
- WTSD-CD in Philadelphia, Pennsylvania
