= KJTL =

Television station in Wichita Falls, Texas

- Wichita Falls, Texas; Lawton, Oklahoma; United States
- City: Wichita Falls, Texas
- Channels: Digital: 15 (UHF); Virtual: 18
- Branding: Texoma's Fox

Programming
- Affiliations: 18.1: Fox; for others, see § Subchannels

Ownership
- Owner: Mission Broadcasting, Inc.
- Operator: Nexstar Media Group
- Sister stations: KFDX-TV, KJBO-LD

History
- First air date: May 14, 1985
- Former channel number: Analog: 18 (UHF, 1985–2009)
- Former affiliations: Independent (1985–1986)
- Call sign meaning: Janet T. Lee, a majority shareholder in Thornberry Television

Technical information
- Licensing authority: FCC
- Facility ID: 7675
- ERP: 1,000 kW
- HAAT: 263 m (863 ft)
- Transmitter coordinates: 34°12′5″N 98°43′46″W
- Translator(s): see § Translators

Links
- Public license information: Public file; LMS
- Website: www.texomashomepage.com

KJTL (channel 18) is a television station licensed to Wichita Falls, Texas, United States, serving as the Fox affiliate for the western Texoma area. Owned by locally based Mission Broadcasting as the company's flagship station, it is operated by Nexstar Media Group alongside KFDX-TV (channel 3), an affiliate of NBC and The CW Plus, and KJBO-LD (channel 35), an independent station with MyNetworkTV. The three stations share studios near Seymour Highway (US 277) and Turtle Creek Road in Wichita Falls; KJTL's transmitter is located near East 1940 and North 2380 Roads in rural southwestern Tillman County, Oklahoma (near Grandfield).

== History ==
=== Early history ===
The UHF channel 18 allocation in the Wichita Falls–Lawton market was contested between two groups that competed for the Federal Communications Commission (FCC)'s approval of a construction permit to build and license to operate a new commercial independent television station on the frequency.

On March 17, 1982, First City Media, Inc.—a locally based company co-founded by Max Andrews and Peter D'Acosta—filed the initial application for the channel 18 license. Just under 1 1/2 months later, on April 30, Thornberry TV Ltd.—an Atlanta-based company owned by William J. Barbin (who owned 36% of the company), Bert Wallace and Janet T. Lee (who each owned 18%), and David Vaughan (who owned the remaining 28%)—filed a separate application. The FCC granted the permit to Thornberry on November 28, 1983. In August 1984, Thornberry was granted use of KJTL as the planned station's callsign, named for minority owner Janet T. Lee.

The station first signed on the air on May 14, 1985, as the fourth commercial television station—after CBS affiliate KAUZ-TV (channel 6, which signed on as KWFT-TV on March 1, 1953), ABC affiliate KSWO-TV (channel 7, which signed on the air on March 8, 1953), and KFDX-TV (channel 3, which signed on April 12, 1953)—and the first commercial UHF outlet to sign on in the Wichita Falls–Lawton market. KJTL originally operated from studio facilities located on Call Field Road in Wichita Falls; the station based its transmitter facilities near Grandfield, Oklahoma, adjacent to the 1,059-foot-tall (323 m) tower operated by KSWO-TV, to provide a signal that could adequately reach most of southwestern Oklahoma and western north Texas. Channel 18 initially maintained a programming inventory typical of an independent station, consisting of first-run and off-network sitcoms and drama series, classic off-network westerns, feature films and cartoons.

In August 1986, Thornberry TV Ltd. transferred ownership of KJTL to Wichita Falls Television, a locally based company owned by D'Acosta, who also served as general manager of channel 18. KJTL became a charter affiliate of the Fox Broadcasting Company when the network inaugurated programming on October 9, 1986. Though it was technically a network affiliate, KJTL continued to be programmed as a de facto independent station as Fox's initial programming lineup consisted solely of a late-night talk show, The Late Show Starring Joan Rivers. Even after its programming expanded with the launch of a three-hour Sunday night lineup in April 1987, Fox aired its prime time programming exclusively on weekends until September 1989, when it began a five-year expansion towards a nightly prime time schedule. Until Fox began airing prime time programs on all seven nights of the week in January 1993, KJTL continued to air a movie at 7 p.m. on nights when the network did not offer any programming.

On May 11, 1989, Wichita Falls Television announced it would sell the station to Wichita Falls-based BSP Broadcasting (which was principally owned by local businessman and eventual Texas House Representative Lanham Lyne) for $1.587 million; the sale was approved by the FCC on June 29 of that year. (The group—which was later renamed Epic Broadcasting Corporation in 1992—would acquire an additional television property in January 1991, when it purchased fellow Fox affiliate KCIT in Amarillo, Texas from Ralph C. Wilson Industries for $2.4 million.) D'Acosta was subsequently appointed as Epic Broadcasting president, a role he would retain after Epic sold its television stations to Wicks Broadcast Group. In the fall of 1993, channel 18 gained a sister station when Epic Broadcasting acquired low-power independent station K35BO (channel 35, now MyNetworkTV affiliate KJBO-LD).

KJTL switched to a 24-hour programming schedule in September 1994, after previously having signed off during the overnight hours each day; a simulcast of now-defunct cable channel MOR Music TV initially filled the former downtime until September 1997, when channel 18 switched to offering home shopping programming from the America's Collectibles Network (now Jewelry Television) during the early morning hours. In May 1995, Epic announced it would sell KJTL and K35BO as well as the Amarillo duopoly of fellow Fox affiliate KCIT and low-powered K65GD (now MyNetworkTV affiliate KCPN-LD) to New York City–based Wicks Broadcast Group—then a primarily radio-based broadcasting division of private equity firm The Wicks Group, which intended the purchases to be a stepping stone to build a group of middle-market television stations complementary to its nine existing radio properties—for $14 million; the sale was finalized on August 31, 1995.

=== JSA/SSA with KFDX ===
On January 6, 1999, Wicks sold the station to Bexley, Ohio–based Mission Broadcasting for $15.5 million. The acquisition of KJTL and KJBO was among the first station acquisitions for Mission (part of a four-station transaction that also involved the purchases of KCIT and KCPN-LP); developed as an arm of its creditor Bastet Broadcasting, the group had formed partnerships with the Nexstar Broadcasting Group and Quorum Broadcasting to operate many of Mission's stations in markets that did not have enough television stations to allow a legal duopoly between two commercial outlets. In the Wichita Falls–Lawton market, Nexstar had been the owner of KFDX-TV since January 1998, when the Irving, Texas–based company acquired the NBC affiliate from U.S. Broadcast Group as part of a $64 million, three-station deal. Nexstar took over the operations of KJTL and KJBO on June 1, 1999, under joint sales and shared services agreements with Mission, under which KFDX would handle news production, engineering, security and certain other services as well as handling advertising sales for the two stations. KJTL and KJBO subsequently vacated their shared facility on Call Field Road and relocated its operations two miles (3.2 km) southeast to KFDX's studio facility on Seymour Highway and Turtle Creek Road.

In September 2002, KJTL changed its on-air branding to "Fox Texoma", in an effort to de-emphasize its Channel 18 broadcast allocation in part because many Texoma area residents viewed the station on cable television (most area cable providers, including Fidelity Communications in Lawton and Charter Spectrum in Wichita Falls, carry KJTL on channel 11). The station's branding was modified to "Texoma's Fox" in September 2011.

== Subchannel history ==
On June 15, 2016, Nexstar Broadcasting Group announced that it had entered into an agreement with Katz Broadcasting to affiliate 81 stations owned and/or operated by the group—including KJTL and KFDX-TV—with one or more of Katz's four digital multicast networks, Escape (now Ion Mystery), Laff, Grit and Bounce TV (the latter of which is owned by Bounce Media LLC, whose COO Jonathan Katz serves as president/CEO of Katz Broadcasting). As part of the agreement, on September 1 of that year, KJTL launched three digital subchannels to serve as affiliates of three of the Katz networks: the station began carrying Grit on virtual channel 18.2, Bounce TV on channel 18.3 and Escape on channel 18.4 (the Laff affiliation rights for the Wichita Falls-Lawton market instead went to KFDX, which launched a tertiary subchannel on the same date).

== Programming ==
=== Sports programming ===
Since September 1994, KJTL has served as the television partner of the Dallas Cowboys for the Wichita Falls-Lawton market. Channel 18 currently holds the local rights to air various team-related programs during the regular season (including the Cowboys Postgame Show, Special Edition with Jerry Jones and the head coach's weekly analysis program The Jason Garrett Show, along with specials such as the Making of the Dallas Cowboys Cheerleaders Calendar and postseason team reviews). Most Cowboys telecasts carried on KJTL are those carried by Fox, which through the network's contract with the National Football League (NFL), holds primary broadcast rights to the National Football Conference (NFC). In addition to carrying Fox-televised games involving in-conference opponents, since 2014, Cowboys games carried on the station also include certain cross-flexed games against opponents in the American Football Conference (AFC) that were originally scheduled to air on CBS. Most Cowboys preseason games not televised by Fox or by other broadcast or cable networks are carried over-the-air locally on sister station KJBO-LP through the Mission Broadcasting duopoly's agreement with the team's syndication service.

=== Newscasts ===
As of September 2016, KFDX-TV produces five hours of locally produced newscasts each week for KJTL (with one hour on weekdays); KJTL does not carry any local news programming on Saturday and Sunday evenings, opting to air syndicated programming following the Fox prime time lineup on those nights. As the duopoly partner of KFDX-TV, the station may also simulcast long-form severe weather coverage in the event that a tornado warning is issued for any county in its viewing area of southwestern Oklahoma and western north Texas.

Following its sale to Mission Broadcasting and the formation of the SSA between the two stations, in the summer of 1999, KJTL entered into a news share agreement with NBC affiliate KFDX-TV to produce a local newscast for channel 18. On September 20, 1999, KFDX began producing a half-hour newscast at 9 p.m. for KJTL, titled Fox 18 News at 9:00, which became the first local prime time newscast to debut in the market. The program originated from a secondary news set at the KFDX/KJTL/KJBO studios on Seymour Highway in Wichita Falls. The broadcast was eventually canceled due to poor ratings, with the last edition airing on December 31, 2001.

After a four-year sabbatical, KFDX resumed production of a prime time newscast for channel 18, which made its debut on September 17, 2007. Originally titled Fox: Texoma's News at 9:00 (later retitled Texoma's Fox News at 9:00 in September 2011), the half-hour show—which also originates from a secondary set at KFDX/KJTL/KJBO's facility—has aired only on Monday through Friday evenings since its debut. (Syndicated programs air in the 9 p.m. timeslot on Saturday and Sunday nights.) The KFDX-produced program originally competed against a prime time newscast produced by CBS affiliate KAUZ-TV for its CW-affiliated DT2 feed that debuted in September 2006; it gained an additional competitor when ABC affiliate KSWO-TV debuted a newscast for its Live Well Network–affiliated DT3 subchannel (now a MeTV affiliate) in September 2012. Both newscasts were eventually discontinued, with KSWO cancelling its 9 p.m. show in December 2014 and KAUZ discontinuing the newscast it produced for its "Texoma CW" subchannel on July 21, 2017.

In July 2012, KFDX began broadcasting its local newscasts in high definition, becoming the market's second Big Three network affiliate (after KSWO-TV) to upgrade its newscasts to the format; KJTL's prime time show was included in the upgrade. In September 2014, KJTL launched a half-hour weekday morning newscast at 8 a.m. (airing one hour later than morning newscasts that air on other Fox stations that do not maintain autonomous news departments). Debuting under the title Texoma's Fox: Morning Edition, the program features the same team that anchors KFDX's conventional morning newscast, KFDX 3 News Today. At that time, the station also began airing a rebroadcast of KFDX's agricultural news and cultural affairs program Texoma Country Morning as a lead-in to the morning newscast.

== Technical information ==
=== Subchannels ===
The station's signal is multiplexed:

Subchannels of KJTL
Channel	Res.	Short name	Programming
18.1	720p	KJTL-DT	Fox
18.2	480i	Grit	Grit (4:3)
18.3	480i	Bounce	Bounce TV
18.4	480i	Escape	Ion Mystery

=== Translators ===
KJTL operates four UHF digital translators, which relay the station's signal to portions of southwestern Oklahoma and western north Texas that are not covered by the main channel 18 signal.

- K20JB-D Hollis, OK
- K32IC-D Altus, OK
- K33HG-D Quanah, TX
- K35OG-D Quanah, TX

=== Analog-to-digital conversion ===
KJTL shut down its analog signal, over UHF channel 18, on February 17, 2009, the original target date on which full-power television stations in the United States were to transition from analog to digital broadcasts under federal mandate (which was later pushed back to June 12, 2009). The station's digital signal remained on its pre-transition UHF channel 15, using virtual channel 18.
