= WTME-LD =

Television station in Memphis, Tennessee

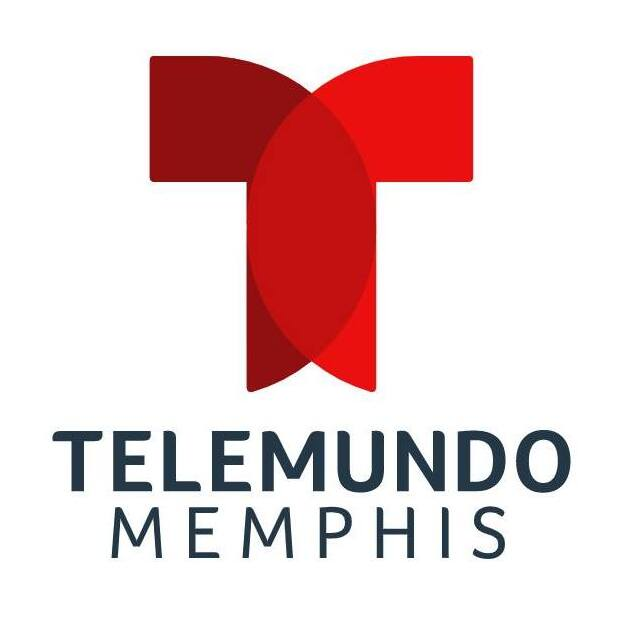
- Memphis, Tennessee (Note: Originally licensed to Bruce, Mississippi; moved to Memphis in 2024.); United States
- Channels: Digital: 14 (UHF); Virtual: 35
- Branding: Telemundo Memphis

Programming
- Affiliations: 35.1: Telemundo; for others, see § Subchannels

Ownership
- Owner: Gray Media; (Gray Television Licensee, LLC)
- Sister stations: WMC-TV

History
- Founded: November 15, 1982
- Former call signs: W07BN (1982–2010); W07BN-D (2010–2020); WYMP-LD (2020–2022)
- Former channel numbers: Analog: 7 (VHF, 1982–2010); Digital: 7 (VHF, 2010–2020)
- Call sign meaning: Telemundo Memphis or Television Memphis

Technical information
- Licensing authority: FCC
- Facility ID: 7359
- Class: LD
- ERP: 15 kW
- HAAT: 286.5 m (940 ft)
- Transmitter coordinates: 35°10′29″N 89°50′43″W

Links
- Public license information: LMS
- Website: www.telemundomemphis.com

WTME-LD (channel 35) is a low-power television station in Memphis, Tennessee, United States, affiliated with the Spanish-language network Telemundo. It is owned by Gray Media alongside NBC affiliate WMC-TV (channel 5). The two stations share studios on Union Avenue in midtown Memphis; WTME-LD's transmitter is located on Raleigh-LaGrange Road on the city's northeast side.

== History ==
The station founded in November 1982 as W07BN, originally licensed to Bruce, Mississippi. It was the first low-power television station in Mississippi. The station aired locally produced programming including a daily newscast, government meetings, music shows, and high school sports. It was also carried on the MaxxSouth cable system throughout North Mississippi.

Owner Bruce Independent Television, Inc. sold the station in 2020 to 5GTV, LLC. The call letters were changed to WYMP-LD on July 23, 2020.

On October 25, 2021, it was announced that WYMP-LD would be sold to Gray Television for $500,000. The sale was completed on February 23, 2022, making it a sister station to WMC-TV. This is despite the fact that Calhoun County (which includes Bruce) lies in the Columbus–Tupelo market, which until 2026 was not served by a Gray-owned station.

The station changed its call sign to WTME-LD on August 22, 2022, the station relocated to Memphis, Tennessee, in early 2024.

On March 10, 2024, WTME-LD switched to Telemundo programming.

== Subchannels ==
The station's signal is multiplexed:

Subchannels of WTME-LD
Subchannel	Res.	Short name	Programming
35.1	1080i	Telmndo	Telemundo
35.2	480i	Outlaw	Outlaw
35.3	480i	MeToons	[Blank]
35.4	1080i	MSphere	MovieSphere Gold
35.5	480i	PTV	Paranormal TV
35.6	480i	365BLK	365BLK
