= KAMR-TV =

Television station in Amarillo, Texas

- Amarillo, Texas; United States
- Channels: Digital: 19 (UHF); Virtual: 4
- Branding: KAMR Local 4

Programming
- Affiliations: 4.1: NBC; 4.2: Independent with MyNetworkTV; for others, see § Subchannels

Ownership
- Owner: Nexstar Media Group; (Nexstar Media Inc.)
- Sister stations: KCIT, KCPN-LD

History
- First air date: March 18, 1953
- Former call signs: KGNC-TV (1953–1974)
- Former channel numbers: Analog: 4 (VHF, 1953–2009)
- Former affiliations: DuMont (secondary, 1953–1956); NTA (secondary, 1956–1961)
- Call sign meaning: Amarillo

Technical information
- Licensing authority: FCC
- Facility ID: 8523
- ERP: 400 kW
- HAAT: 455.2 m (1,493 ft)
- Transmitter coordinates: 35°20′33.1″N 101°49′21.2″W
- Translator(s): see § Subchannels

Links
- Public license information: Public file; LMS
- Website: www.myhighplains.com

KAMR-TV (channel 4) is a television station in Amarillo, Texas, United States, affiliated with NBC. It is owned by Nexstar Media Group alongside KCPN-LD (channel 33)—an independent station with MyNetworkTV—and co-managed with Fox affiliate KCIT (channel 14). The three stations share studios on Southeast 11th Avenue and South Fillmore Street in downtown Amarillo; KAMR-TV's transmitter is located on Dumas Drive (US 87–287) and Reclamation Plant Road in rural unincorporated Potter County.

== History ==
On September 5, 1951, the Plains Radio Broadcasting Company—a subsidiary of Globe News Publishing Co. (owned by landowner and oilman Roy N. Whittenburg and civic leader Samuel "S. B." Whittenburg), then-publisher of the Amarillo Globe-News and owner of radio station KGNC (710 AM)—filed an application with the Federal Communications Commission (FCC) to obtain a license and construction permit to operate a commercial television station on VHF channel 4. The FCC awarded the license and permit for channel 4 to Plains Radio Broadcasting on October 8, 1952; the group subsequently requested and received approval to assign KGNC-TV (for Globe-News Company) as the television station's call letters.

The station first signed on the air on March 18, 1953. KGNC-TV was the first television station to sign on in the Amarillo market, debuting two weeks before KFDA-TV (channel 10) signed on as the market's CBS affiliate on April 4. Channel 4 has been an NBC television affiliate since its debut, inheriting those rights through KGNC radio's longtime relationship with the progenitor NBC Red Network, which had been affiliated with that station since January 1937; it also maintained a secondary affiliations with the DuMont Television Network. The operations of KGNC-TV were originally located at a facility on North Polk Street and Northeast 24th Avenue in northeastern Amarillo, which it shared with KGNC radio. DuMont shut down in 1955, amid various issues that arose from its relations with Paramount that hamstrung it from expansion; that year, the station joined the NTA Film Network until that network closed in 1961.

On October 8, 1966, the Globe News Publishing Company announced that it would sell KGNC-TV and its sister radio properties to Topeka, Kansas-based Stauffer Communications (a family-owned company run by Oscar S. Stauffer, Stanley H. Stauffer, John H. Stauffer and Marion W. Stauffer) for $5.6 million (split between Globe-News Publishing for $4.225 million plus a three-year non-compete agreement worth $300,000, and $1.375 million to Plains Broadcasting); the sale was approved by the FCC on January 12, 1966. The Whittenburg family retained ownership of the Globe-News.

In October 1973, Stauffer announced it would sell KGNC-TV to Cannan Communications—a locally based company managed under the direction of Darrell A. Cannan, Sr. and Darrell A. Cannan, Jr.—for $2.5 million; the sale received FCC approval, along with the renewal of the KGNC-TV license, on July 31, 1974. In order to comply with an FCC rule in effect at the time that prohibited separately owned radio and television stations in the same market from sharing the same base call letters, as Stauffer was allowed to keep the KGNC call letters for its new radio properties, the station's call letters were changed to KAMR-TV (in reference to its city of license, Amarillo) on November 5 of that year.

During the late 1980s, KAMR-TV had experienced a gradual ratings downturn in both local news and, to a lesser extent, in total-day viewership. Especially troubling for KAMR was that its ratings decline occurred at a timeframe when NBC's ratings were otherwise strong, thanks to its prime time programming (including its Thursday night comedy lineup). Not helping matters was that NBC also held partial broadcast rights to the NFL's American Football Conference (which it continued to broadcast through 1997, when those rights shifted to CBS [and by association, KFDA-TV]), which included rights to Super Bowls following the 1992, 1993, 1995, and 1997 seasons. Each of these telecasts featured an NFC or AFC team of interest to significant cohorts of KAMR's viewing area (particularly, the Dallas Cowboys and the Denver Broncos). Meanwhile, KFDA's ratings continued to improve despite CBS losing its NFL telecast rights after the 1993 season. (Note: Prior to 1993, KFDA's final Super Bowl telecast determined 1991's NFL champions; after CBS regained the NFL rights in 1998, channel 10 also carried the Super Bowl that determined the champions for the 2000 season.)

On January 5, 1999, Boston-based Quorum Broadcasting announced that it would purchase KAMR-TV from Cannan Communications as part of a $64-million, three-station deal. The following day (January 6), Westlake, Ohio–based Mission Broadcasting announced that it would acquire KCIT and KCPN-LP from Wichita Falls–based Wicks Broadcast Group for $13 million; the sale to Quorum received FCC approval on February 23, 1999. Quorum took over the operations of KCIT and KCPN on June 1, 1999, under joint sales and shared services agreements with Mission, under which KAMR would handle news production, engineering, security and certain other services as well as handling advertising sales for the two stations. Although KAMR was the senior partner in the deal, it subsequently vacated its longtime studio facility on North Polk Street, and relocated its operations seven miles (11 km) south to KCIT/KCPN's facility on South Fillmore Street. (Note: The former Polk Street studio is now occupied by the Faith Clinic Christian Center Church, which relocated its campus into the building in July 2003.)

On September 8, 2003, Irving, Texas–based Nexstar Broadcasting Group announced that it would acquire Quorum Broadcasting's ten television stations, including KAMR-TV and the JSA/SSAs involving KCIT and KCPN-LP, for $230 million; the sale of KAMR to Quorum and the transfer of the joint sales and shared services agreements to Nexstar was completed on December 31, 2003.

On February 25, 2013, the over-the-air signals of KAMR, KCIT and KCPN were knocked off the air for more than 18 hours as a result of electricity fluctuations that shut off cooling pumps on the stations' transmitter tower off of US 287 during a major blizzard that crippled much of the Texas Panhandle. Snow drifts of up to 4 feet (1.2 m) prevented station employees from accessing the site until the morning of February 26, in order to restore power to the transmitters. All three stations remained available to Suddenlink Communications systems in the area through a direct fiber feed.

== Programming ==
KAMR-TV currently broadcasts the majority of the NBC schedule, although the station currently does not clear most of NBC's overnight programming (preempting its weekend lifestyle lineup outright and carrying Early Today as a single half-hour broadcast instead of offering most of its customary overnight loop), preferring to carry infomercials and some syndicated programming in the designated time period (particularly on Tuesday through Saturday mornings after Late Night with Seth Meyers). KAMR broadcast Dr. Red Duke's syndicated medical reports to viewers in the Texas Panhandle throughout the 1980s and 1990s. From its 1986 start until the 2002–03 season, KAMR aired The Oprah Winfrey Show to viewers on the High Plains when the show moved to ABC affiliate KVII-TV for its last nine years on the air (2010–11).

The station also produces the news/talk/lifestyle program Studio 4, which airs weekdays at 4 p.m.; the hour-long show debuted on October 4, 2010.

=== News operation ===
As of September 2026, KAMR-TV presently broadcasts 26 hours, 55 minutes of locally produced newscasts each week (with 5 hours, 5 minutes on weekdays; a half-hour on Saturdays and one hour on Sundays). Unlike most NBC-affiliated stations in the Central Time Zone, it does not carry a midday newscast (instead, the NBC news program NBC News Daily fills the noon timeslot) or a full-length morning newscast of two to 2 1/2 hours (running only 90 minutes) on weekdays, nor does it produce an early evening newscast on Saturdays and Sundays.

In addition, KAMR produces six hours of locally produced newscasts each week for Fox-affiliated sister station KCIT (with one hour on weekdays, and a half-hour each on Saturday and Sundays). Through the shared services agreement with KCIT, the station may also simulcast long-form severe weather coverage on channel 14 in the event that a tornado warning is issued for any county in its viewing area within the Texas and Oklahoma Panhandles as well as Eastern New Mexico.

==== News department history ====
Concurrent to Cannan Communications's purchase of KAMR, in 1974, the station adopted the Action News format, which allowed it to feature more stories within its newscasts than those seen on KVII and KFDA due to strict time limits on story packages. In October 1990, as part of a major re-imaging of the station, KAMR retitled its newscasts from Action News 4 to News 4. However, these changes—as well as the adoption of "Straight Facts, Straight to You" as its news slogan (which was also used by fellow NBC affiliate KMOL-TV [now WOAI-TV] in San Antonio during the time period)—did little to improve the station's mediocre local news ratings, which had slid from second place during 1989 to an ever-more-distant third by the November 1990 sweeps period; KFDA, which had long rated at third place in local news, overtook KAMR for the #2 spot. (KFDA would surge to first place by the end of the 1990s.)

Following their respective sales to Quorum and Mission Broadcasting and the formation of the SSA between the two stations, on March 11, 2001, KAMR began producing a half-hour newscast at 9 p.m. through a news share agreement with Fox affiliate KCIT. The program, titled Fox 14 News at 9:00, was KCIT's second attempt at a local newscast (following an in-house effort that lasted from its sign-on in October 1982 until its news operation was shut down in 1995) and originated from a secondary set at KAMR/KCIT/KCPN's South Fillmore Street studios. The program competes against an existing 9 p.m. newscast on CW affiliate KVII-DT2, which parent station KVII-TV premiered in September 2012. Originally co-anchored by Kelly James and Paige Smith (née Cook) on Sundays through Friday nights and Mel Hernandez on Saturdays, the newscast was structured to mix a conventional news format with the so-called "Fox attitude" in an effort to both court younger and appeal to traditional news viewers.

Following the completion of Nexstar's purchase of KAMR in 2003, the news department saw the departures of several high-profile anchors. Weeknight anchors Jay Ricci and Paige Cook both quit after Nexstar management asked them to accept a reduction in their salaries in contract renewal negotiations. (Both subsequently joined KVII-TV; sports director Andy Justus shifted to news, taking over Ricci's seat on the evening newscasts.) Mary Allison-Parker (who rejoined the station in February of that year, following a previous run as anchor/reporter from 1987 to 1996) also resigned after she refused to shift from anchoring the KCIT 9 p.m. newscast to KAMR's weeknight broadcasts, citing that she was on a part-time contract that precluded her from working such an expanded shift.

On September 8, 2026, KAMR launched an hour-long show called "The Top 4", which completely focuses on stories that are based in the panhandle. That way, panhandle viewers will have another option to receive local news and KAMR will catch more viewers during the schedule.

==== Notable former on-air staff ====
- Dick Williams – weather anchor/children's program host

== Technical information ==
=== Subchannels ===
The station's signal is multiplexed:

Subchannels of KAMR-TV
Channel	Res.	Short name	Programming
4.1	1080i	KAMR-HD	NBC
4.2	1080i	KCPN-HD	KCPN-LD (Independent with MyNetworkTV)
4.3	480i	Laff	Laff
4.4	480i	Ant TV	Antenna TV

Simulcast of subchannels of another station

=== Analog-to-digital conversion ===
KAMR-TV shut down its analog signal, over VHF channel 4, on June 12, 2009, the official date on which full-power television stations in the United States transitioned from analog to digital television under federal mandate. The station's digital signal remained on its pre-transition UHF channel 19, using virtual channel 4.

The main channel was converted to 720p high definition on May 22, 2017. As of September 2017, the NBC feed was restored to its native 1080i resolution.

=== Translators ===
KAMR-TV covers a large portion of northern Texas, the Oklahoma Panhandle and northeastern New Mexico through many translators that distribute its programming beyond the 65.6-mile-wide (105.6 km) range of its broadcast signal. All translators transmit on virtual channel 4, and (with the exception of K25CP-D and K27NL-D, which are owned by Nexstar directly) are owned by local translator cooperatives:

- K14QV-D Childress, TX
- K29MZ-D Clarendon, TX
- K27NL-D Clovis, NM
- K28GI-D Guymon, OK
- K24NK-D Memphis, TX
- K23OI-D Tucumcari, NM
- K25CP-D Tulia, TX
- K22JR-D Turkey, TX

== See also ==
- Channel 19 digital TV stations in the United States
- Channel 4 virtual TV stations in the United States
