= Mass media in Oklahoma City =

As of 2016, the Oklahoma City metropolitan area is the 41st-largest media market in the United States, as ranked by Nielsen Media Research, with 722,140 television households (0.6% of all U.S. homes) and 1.2 million people aged 12+. The following is a summary of broadcast and print media in Oklahoma City:

== Newspapers and magazines ==
The major daily newspaper published in Oklahoma City is The Oklahoman, which has the largest circulation of the state's newspapers. There are also a number of regional and special-interest newspapers such as the Black Chronicle, the Oklahoma Gazette and The Journal Record.

=== Daily ===
- The Journal Record
- The Oklahoman

=== Weekly ===
- Baptist Messenger
- Bethany Tribune
- Choctaw Times
- Black Chronicle
- The Capitol Hill Beacon
- El Latino American (Spanish)
- El Nacional (Spanish)
- OK VIETIMES (Vietnamese)
- Oklahoma Chinese Times (Chinese)
- The Oklahoma City Herald
- Oklahoma Gazette
- Sooner Catholic

=== Community ===
- Choctaw Sun
- Eastern Oklahoma County News (Harrah)
- The Edmond Sun
- Harrah Sun
- Jones Sun
- Luther Sun
- Midwest City Beacon
- Moore Monthly
- Nicoma Park Sun
- Spencer Sun
- The Vista (Edmond)

=== Business, legal, entertainment and other local periodicals ===
- Apartment Locator
- The Brides of Oklahoma
- The Campus (Oklahoma City University)
- The City Sentinel
- distinctly Oklahoma Magazine
- Durocher's Oklahoma City Business Report
- Edmond Life and Leisure
- Edmond Outlook
- EscapeOKC Magazine
- The Gayly Oklahoman
- Gossip Boy
- House & Home Magazine
- The Journal Record
- KeyOKC
- MetroFamily Magazine
- Moore Monthly
- Nuestra Comunidad Oklahoma (bilingual)
- OCU LAW Magazine (Oklahoma City University)
- OKC N Style Magazine
- okcBIZ
- Oklahoma Banker
- Oklahoma City Apartments
- Oklahoma City Friday
- Oklahoma City Guide
- Oklahoma City News
- Oklahoma Constitution
- Oklahoma County News
- Oklahoma Gazette
- Oklahoma Living
- Oklahoma News
- Oklahoma Senior Life News
- Oklahoma Today
- Oklahoma Woman Magazine
- Oklahoma's Nursing Times
- Outdoor Oklahoma
- Preview Magazine
- Pure Magazine
- 405 Magazine, formerly Slice Magazine
- So6ix
- TalkOKC
- Tinker Take Off (Tinker Air Force Base)
- The Vista (University of Central Oklahoma)
- Universal Republic (online only)
- VYPE High School Sports Magazine

=== Defunct newspapers and publications ===
- Bethany News
- The Black Dispatch
- Mid City Advocate
- Northwest Metro Times
- Oklahoma City Times

== Radio ==
As of September 2011, Oklahoma City is the 48th largest radio market in the United States, according to Arbitron. The following is a list of radio stations serving the Oklahoma City area:

=== AM stations ===
- 640 KWPN Oklahoma City (Sports)
- 800 KQCV Oklahoma City (Christian/Bott)
- 890 KTLR Oklahoma City (Christian)
- 930 WKY Oklahoma City (Sports)
- 1000 KTOK Oklahoma City (Talk)
- 1140 KRMP Oklahoma City (Urban AC)
- 1220 KTLV Midwest City (Gospel)
- 1340 KGHM Oklahoma City (Sports)
- 1400 KREF Norman (Sports)
- 1460 KZUE El Reno (Spanish/variety)
- 1520 KOKC Oklahoma City (Talk)
- 1560 KEBC Del City (Sports)

=== FM stations ===
- 88.1 KMSI Moore (Inspirational)
- 88.5 KZTH Piedmont (Christian contemporary)
- 88.9 KYLV Oklahoma City (K-Love)
- 89.3 KSSO Norman (Gospel)
- 90.1 KUCO Edmond (Classical)
- 90.9 KOKF Edmond (Air1)
- 91.7 KOSU Stillwater (NPR/modern rock)
- 92.5 KOMA Oklahoma City (Classic hits)
- 93.3 KJKE Newcastle (Classic country)
- 93.7 KSPI-FM Stillwater (Hot AC)
- 94.7 KOKQ Oklahoma City (Classic rock)
- 95.1 KQCV-FM Shawnee (Religious/Bott)
- 96.1 KXXY-FM Oklahoma City (Classic country)
- 96.9 KQOB Enid (Conservative talk)
- 97.3 KKNG-FM Blanchard (Catholic/EWTN)
- 98.1 WWLS-FM The Village (Sports)
- 98.9 KYIS Oklahoma City (Hot AC)
- 99.7 KWFF Mustang (Country)
- 100.5 KATT-FM Oklahoma City (Rock)
- 101.9 KTST Oklahoma City (Country)
- 102.7 KJYO Oklahoma City (Contemporary hit radio)
- 103.5 KVSP Anadarko (Mainstream urban)
- 104.1 KMGL Oklahoma City (Adult contemporary)
- 104.9 KKWD Bethany (Adult hits)
- 105.3 KINB Kingfisher (Sports)
- 105.7 KROU Spencer (NPR/jazz)
- 106.3 KGOU Norman (NPR/jazz)
- 106.7 KTUZ-FM Okarche (Spanish/variety)
- 107.7 KRXO-FM Oklahoma City (Sports)

=== Low-power FM stations and translators ===
- 89.5 K208CG Oklahoma City (Christian/CSN)
- 92.1 K221FQ Oklahoma City (Urban AC/KRMP simulcast)
- 92.9 K225BN Oklahoma City (Alternative rock/KOMA-HD2 simulcast)
- 93.9 KWDW-LP Oklahoma City (Spanish Christian)
- 94.1 K231BH Oklahoma City (Christian/KTLR simulcast)
- 95.3 K237GE Oklahoma City (Talk/KOKC simulcast)
- 96.5 K243BJ Oklahoma City (Spanish oldies/KRXO-HD3 simulcast)
- 97.5 KCYI-LP Edmond (Smooth jazz)
- 97.7 K249FG Oklahoma City (Spanish/variety/KZUE simulcast)
- 97.7 KRGU-LP Midwest City (Spanish Catholic)
- 98.5 K253AY Norman (Sports/KREF simulcast)
- 98.5 K253BV Oklahoma City (Regional Mexican/KBRU-HD2 simulcast)
- 99.3 KHDD-LP Oklahoma City (Spanish Catholic)
- 99.3 KZUC-LP Edmond (Adult album alternative)
- 100.9 KSMJ-LP Edmond (Catholic)
- 101.3 KPCG-LP Edmond (Catholic)
- 104.5 K283BW Oklahoma City (Classic rock/KRXO-HD2 simulcast)

== Television ==
Oklahoma City is the 44th largest designated market area for television in the United States (as ranked by Nielsen Media Research); the DMA serves 34 counties in the northern, west-central and central portions of the state. The Oklahoma City area has 19 television stations, including 12 full-power and six low-power (analog or digital) stations:

=== Full-power ===
- 4 KFOR-TV Oklahoma City (NBC)
- 5 KOCO-TV Oklahoma City (ABC)
- 9 KWTV-DT Oklahoma City (CBS)
- 13 KETA-TV Oklahoma City (PBS)
- 14 KTBO-TV Oklahoma City (TBN)
- 25 KOKH-TV Oklahoma City (Fox)
- 30 KTUZ-TV Shawnee (Telemundo)
- 34 KOCB Oklahoma City (Independent)
- 35 KUOK Woodward (Univision)
- 43 KAUT-TV Oklahoma City (The CW)
- 46 KOCM Norman (Daystar)
- 52 KSBI Oklahoma City (MyNetworkTV)
- 62 KOPX-TV Oklahoma City (Ion Television)

=== Low-power ===
- 21 KUOT-CD Oklahoma City (3ABN)
- 22 KTOU-LD Oklahoma City (beIN Sports Xtra)
- 24 KOMI-CD Woodward (YTA TV)
- 31 KLHO-LD Oklahoma City (Spanish religious independent)
- 36 KUOK-CD Oklahoma City (Univision)
- 45 KOHC-CD Oklahoma City (Azteca America)
- 47 K35MV-D Concho (FNX)
- 48 KUOC-LD Enid (Infomercials)
- 48 KOCY-LD Oklahoma City (Estrella TV)

=== Subscription television ===
The Oklahoma City area is primarily served by Cox Communications for cable television and AT&T U-verse for Internet Protocol television. Cox Communications parent Cox Enterprises was awarded the cable franchise rights to Oklahoma City proper by the Oklahoma City Council in February 1979, and commenced service in the city in April 1980. Until the latter system's dissolution in December 1983, cable service in the immediate Oklahoma City area was split between the main Cox Cable system and Pan Oklahoma Communications, a joint venture that was 80% owned by Cox Enterprises (the same equity stake it initially held with the western Oklahoma City Cox franchise) with the remaining 20% owned by seven majority stockholders and four minority stockholders based in the city. In 1984, Cox Communications acquired 10% of the remnant shares owned by the six local shareholders in Cox Cable of Oklahoma City, which expanded its service area into areas of northeastern Oklahoma City (located east of Western Avenue, the service delineation point for both systems) as well as the bordering unincorporated community of Forest Park that had previously been served by Pan Oklahoma.

Multimedia Cablevision served as the cable provider for the city's suburbs and adjacent areas (including among others, Bethany, Edmond, Guthrie, Midwest City–Del City, Choctaw, Harrah, Moore, Nichols Hills, Norman and Yukon). Multimedia first incorporated in the metropolitan area when it established a system in Moore and Del City in 1979; the company expanded its service area in 1983, when it acquired the American Cablevision systems in Norman (which launched in 1976 as the first cable provider in the Oklahoma City metropolitan area), Midwest City–Spencer (incorporated in July 1979), Stillwater and Cushing from American Television and Communications Corporation (AT&C) in a trade deal involving two AT&C-owned systems in North Carolina. Cox Communications would purchase Multimedia's suburban Oklahoma City systems from the Gannett Company (as part of a $2.7-billion acquisition of its systems in Oklahoma, Kansas and North Carolina) in July 1999, with those systems formally being taken over by Cox on February 1, 2000. AT&T U-verse rolled out its Internet Protocol television service to portions of Oklahoma City, Edmond, Moore and Norman in August 2007; U-verse would expand its service into additional suburban communities (including Midwest City, Mustang, Nichols Hills, The Village, Wheatland and Yukon) by the summer of 2008.

From 1978 until 1984, Oklahoma City was also served by TV-Q Movie Systems, a Multichannel Multipoint Distribution Service which was the first provider to offer pay television service in Oklahoma City proper; TVQ—which transmitted its signal via antenna to Oklahoma City and adjacent suburbs within a 30-mile (48 km) radius—exclusively carried programming from HBO and SuperStation WTBS (now TBS) as well as, upon converting into a multichannel service in 1981, Nickelodeon. Antenna Vision was launched in 1990 as a 21-channel MMDS offering featuring broadcast stations, and a limited lineup of basic and premium channels from a transmitter atop the Liberty Bank Tower in downtown Oklahoma City (which had previously housed TV-Q and VEU's respective transmission facilities). Launched by Multimedia Cablevision, it made use of additional frequencies licensed to the service by the Federal Communications Commission (FCC), and reached a 12-mile (19 km) radius covering most of Oklahoma, northern Cleveland and eastern Canadian counties; American Telecasting purchased Antenna Vision in 1994, folding the latter provider into its WanTV wireless cable service (which remained in operation until 2001).

Oklahoma City also served as the pilot market for Video Entertainment Unlimited (VEU), a subscription service launched in October 1980 by Golden West Broadcasters over its then-fledgling independent station KAUT-TV, which transmitted the service during the nighttime hours seven days a week as well as on weekend afternoons. VEU – which was formatted similarly to premium cable networks (such as HBO and Showtime) as well as other over-the-air subscription television services of the time period (such as ONTV and SelecTV), offering a mix of unedited movies, music specials and sporting events—expanded to include affiliates in Dallas–Fort Worth and Atlanta; VEU—which was dropped by KAUT in September 1982, in favor of offering a full-time schedule of syndicated and local entertainment programs available for free to the entire media market—ceased operations on its two other affiliates in September 1984, as cable television service expanded its reach throughout the Dallas-Fort Worth and Atlanta markets.

== Digital media ==
- OKC Talk
- The Lost Ogle
- Non Doc

== See also ==
- Oklahoma media
- List of newspapers in Oklahoma
- List of radio stations in Oklahoma
- List of television stations in Oklahoma
- Media of locales in Oklahoma: Broken Arrow, Lawton, Norman, Tulsa
