= List of radio stations in Oklahoma =

The following is a list of FCC-licensed radio stations in the U.S. state of Oklahoma, which can be sorted by their call signs, frequencies, cities of license, licensees, and programming formats.

== List of radio stations ==
Call sign	Frequency	City of License	Licensee	Branding / Format
KACO	98.5 FM	Apache	Mollman Media, Inc.	Country
KADA	1230 AM	Ada	The Chickasaw Nation	Alternative rock
KADA-FM	99.3 FM	Ada	The Chickasaw Nation	Adult contemporary
KADS	1240 AM	Elk City	Paragon Communications, Inc.	Sports (WWLS)
KAJT	88.7 FM	Ada	Family Worship Center Church, Inc.	Gospel
KAKC	1300 AM	Tulsa	iHM Licenses, LLC	Conservative talk
KAKO	91.3 FM	Ada	American Family Association	American Family Radio / Religious Talk
KALU	89.3 FM	Langston	Langston University	Urban contemporary
KALV	1430 AM	Alva	Remember Radio, LLC	Progressive country
KARG	91.7 FM	Poteau	American Family Association	American Family Radio / Inspirational
KARU	88.9 FM	Cache	Educational Media Foundation	Air1 / Worship music
KATT-FM	100.5 FM	Oklahoma City	Radio License Holding CBC, LLC	Mainstream rock
KAYC	91.1 FM	Durant	American Family Association	American Family Radio / Religious Talk
KAYE-FM	90.7 FM	Tonkawa	Northern Oklahoma College	Top 40 (CHR)
KAYM	90.5 FM	Weatherford	American Family Association	American Family Radio / Inspirational
KAZC	89.3 FM	Dickson	The Chickasaw Nation	Community radio
KBBC	99.7 FM	Tishomingo	Mid-Continental Broadcasting, LLC	Adult hits
KJAL	91.9 FM	McAlester	The Christian Center, Inc.	
KBEL	1240 AM	Idabel	KBEL Communications, LLC	News/Talk
KBEL-FM	96.7 FM	Idabel	KBEL Communications, LLC	Country
KBIJ	99.5 FM	Guymon	OMI Oilfield Investments, LLC	Regional Mexican
KBIX	1490 AM	Muskogee	Grupo Teletul Multimedia, LLC	Regional Mexican
KBLP	105.1 FM	Lindsay	KBLP Partners, LLC	Country
KBWW	88.3 FM	Broken Bow	Golden Baptist Church	Southern gospel
KBZI	106.1 FM	Mooreland	One Media, Inc.	Classic hits
KBZQ	99.5 FM	Lawton	Local Radio, L.L.C.	Adult contemporary
KCBK	91.5 FM	Frederick	South Central Oklahoma Christian Broadcasting, Inc.	Southern gospel
KCCU	89.3 FM	Lawton	Cameron University	Public radio
KCFO	970 AM	Tulsa	SMG-Tulsa, LLC	Talk
KCLI	1320 AM	Clinton	Wright Broadcasting Systems, Inc.	Sports
KCLI-FM	99.3 FM	Cordell	Wright Broadcasting Systems, Inc.	News/Talk
KCNP	89.5 FM	Ada	The Chickasaw Nation	Community radio
KCRC	1390 AM	Enid	Chisholm Trail Broadcasting Co.	Sports (FSR)
KCSC-FM	95.9 FM	Woodward	The Christian Center, Inc.	Religious
KCXR	100.3 FM	Taft	Key Plus Broadcasting, LLC	Regional Mexican
KCYI-LP	97.7 FM	Edmond	Edwards Broadcasting	Smooth jazz
KDDQ	105.3 FM	Comanche	Mollman Media, Inc.	Classic rock
KDKL	103.7 FM	Okemah	Educational Media Foundation	K-Love / Contemporary Christian
KDOE	102.3 FM	Antlers	Will Payne	Adult contemporary
KEBC	1560 AM	Del City	Tyler Media LLC	Sports (SM)
KECO	96.5 FM	Elk City	Paragon Communications, Inc.	Country
KEMX	94.5 FM	Locust Grove	Key Plus Broadcasting, LLC	Active rock
KEOK	102.1 FM	Tahlequah	Payne 5 Communications, LLC	Country
KETU	1120 AM	Catoosa	Radio Las Americas Arkansas, LLC	Spanish Pop
KEUC	104.9 FM	Ringwood	Oklahoma Catholic Broadcasting, Inc.	Catholic
KEYB	107.9 FM	Altus	High Plains Radio Network, LLC	Country
KFPP-LP	93.3 FM	Woodward	Woodward Catholic Radio, Inc.	Catholic
KFTP	1350 AM	Duncan	Mollman Media, Inc.	News/Talk
KFWG-LP	98.3 FM	Clinton	Universal Truth Radio, Ltd	Catholic
KFXH	88.7 FM	Marlow	Houston Christian Broadcasters, Inc.	Religious
KFXI	92.1 FM	Marlow	DFWU, Inc.	Country
KFXT	90.7 FM	Sulphur	Houston Christian Broadcasters, Inc.	Religious
KFXU	90.5 FM	Chickasha	Houston Christian Broadcasters, Inc.	Religious
KGCG-LP	93.9 FM	Blanchard	J&C Country Church Inc	Country gospel
KGFF	1450 AM	Shawnee	Citizen Potawatomi Nation	Classic hits
KGFY	105.5 FM	Stillwater	Stillwater Broadcasting, LLC	Country
KGHM	1340 AM	Midwest City	iHM Licenses, LLC	Sports (FSR)
KGLC	100.9 FM	Miami	Taylor Made Broadcasting Network, LLC	Classic hits
KGND	1470 AM	Vinita	KXOJ, Inc.	Sports (FSR)
KGOU	106.3 FM	Norman	The University of Oklahoma	NPR / News/Talk / Jazz/Blues
KGTO	1050 AM	Tulsa	KJMM, Inc.	Urban adult contemporary
KGUY	91.3 FM	Guymon	Kanza Society, Inc.	High Plains Public Radio / News, Classical, Jazz
KGVE	99.3 FM	Grove	Taylor Made Broadcasting Network, LLC	Country
KGVV	90.5 FM	Goltry	The Love Station, Inc.	Contemporary Christian
KGWA	960 AM	Enid	Williams Broadcasting LLC	News Talk Information
KGYN	1210 AM	Guymon	Steckline Communications, Inc.	Talk
KHDD-LP	99.3 FM	Oklahoma City	Oklahoma Catholic Family Conference, Inc.	Catholic Spanish
KHEV	90.3 FM	Fairview	Great Plains Christian Radio, Inc.	Contemporary Christian/Christian Talk and Teaching
KHIM	97.7 FM	Mangum	Fuchs Radio L.L.C.	Classic hits
KHKC-FM	102.1 FM	Atoka	Keystone Broadcasting Corporation	Country
KHRK	97.7 FM	Hennessey	Chisholm Trail Broadcasting Co	Classic rock
KHTT	106.9 FM	Muskogee	Griffin Licensing, L.L.C.	Top 40 (CHR)
KHWL	98.7 FM	Lone Wolf	Fuchs Radio LLC	Red dirt country
KHWR-LP	92.7 FM	McAlester	Flames of Truth Crusades	Religious Teaching
KIBE	104.9 FM	Broken Bow	Eastern Oklahoma State College	Variety
KICM	97.7 FM	Healdton	Keystone Broadcasting Corporation	Country, Top 40 (CHR)
KIEL	89.3 FM	Loyal	New Life Mission	Radio 74 Internationale / Religious
KIMY	93.9 FM	Watonga	South Central Oklahoma Christian Broadcasting, Inc	Southern gospel
KINB	105.3 FM	Kingfisher	Perry Media Group, LLC	Sports (ISN)
KIRC	105.9 FM	Seminole	One Ten Broadcast Group, Inc.	Country
KITO-FM	96.1 FM	Vinita	KXOJ, Inc.	Sports (WWLS)
KITX	95.5 FM	Hugo	Payne Media Group LLC	Country
KIXO	106.1 FM	Sulphur	The Love Station, Inc.	Contemporary Christian
KIZS	101.5 FM	Collinsville	iHM Licenses, LLC	Regional Mexican
KJCC	89.5 FM	Carnegie	CSN International	CSN International / Religious
KJCM	100.3 FM	Snyder	Fuchs Radio L.L.C.	Sports (WWLS/ESPN)
KJDR	88.1 FM	Guymon	Top O Texas Educational Broadcasting Foundation	Religious
KJHL	90.9 FM	Boise City	Great Plains Christian Radio, Inc.	Christian adult contemporary/Christian Talk and Teaching
KJKE	93.3 FM	Newcastle	Tyler Broadcasting Corporation	Country
KJMM	105.3 FM	Bixby	KJMM, Inc.	Mainstream urban
KJMU	1340 AM	Sand Springs	Birach Broadcasting Corporation	Urban gospel
KJMZ	97.9 FM	Cache	Mollman Media, Inc.	Urban contemporary
KJOK	102.7 FM	Hollis	High Plains Radio Network, LLC	Classic rock
KJOV	90.7 FM	Woodward	Great Plains Christian Radio, Inc.	Christian adult contemporary/Christian Talk and Teaching
KJRF	91.1 FM	Lawton	The Christian Center, Inc.	Christian
KRHZ	103.3 FM	Tulsa	Zoellner Media Group LLC	Classic rock
KJTH	89.7 FM	Ponca City	The Love Station, Inc.	Contemporary Christian
KJYO	102.7 FM	Oklahoma City	iHM Licenses, LLC	Top 40 (CHR)
KKAJ-FM	95.7 FM	Davis	SMG-Ardmore, LLC	Country
KKBD	95.9 FM	Sallisaw	iHM Licenses, LLC	Classic rock
KKBI	106.1 FM	Broken Bow	JL Radio LLC	Country
KKBS	92.7 FM	Guymon	MLS Communications, Inc.	Album-oriented rock (AOR)
KKEN	97.1 FM	Duncan	Mollman Media, Inc.	Country
KKLB	89.1 FM	Bartlesville	Educational Media Foundation	K-Love / Contemporary Chrisitan
KKNG-FM	97.3 FM	Blanchard	KKNG Radio LLC	Catholic
KKRD	91.1 FM	Enid	Educational Media Foundation	Air1 / Worship music
KKRI	88.1 FM	Pocola	Educational Media Foundation	Air1 / Worship music
KKRX	1380 AM	Lawton	Mollman Media, Inc.	Urban adult contemporary
KKVO	90.9 FM	Altus	Educational Media Foundation	K-Love / Contemporary Christian
KKWD	104.9 FM	Bethany	Radio License Holding CBC, LLC	Adult hits
KKZU	101.7 FM	Sayre	Wright Broadcasting Systems, Inc.	Classic rock
KLAW	101.3 FM	Lawton	Townsquare License, LLC	Country
KLBC	106.3 FM	Durant	Mid-Continental Broadcasting, LLC	Country
KLCU	90.3 FM	Ardmore	Cameron University	Public radio
KLOR-FM	99.3 FM	Ponca City	Team Radio LLC	Classic hits
KLRB	89.9 FM	Stuart	Lighthouse of Prayer, Inc.	Southern gospel
KLRC	90.9 FM	Tahlequah	John Brown University	Christian adult contemporary
KLSI	107.3 FM	Mooreland	Classic Communications, Inc.	Classic hits
KLVV	88.7 FM	Ponca City	The Love Station, Inc.	Contemporary Christian
KMAD	1550 AM	Madill	North Texas Radio Group, L.P.	Christian
KMCO	101.3 FM	McAlester	Southeastern Oklahoma Radio, LLC	Country
KMFS	1490 AM	Guthrie	Family Worship Center Church, Inc.	Gospel
KMGL	104.1 FM	Oklahoma City	Tyler Media, L.L.C.	Adult contemporary
KMGZ	95.3 FM	Lawton	Broadco of Texas, Inc.	Hot adult contemporary
KMMY	96.5 FM	Soper	Will Payne	Active rock
KMOD-FM	97.5 FM	Tulsa	iHM Licenses, LLC	Active rock
KMSI	88.1 FM	Moore	David Ingles Ministries Church Inc.	Religious
KMUS	1380 AM	Sperry	Radio Las Americas LLC	Regional Mexican
KMYZ-FM	104.5 FM	Pryor	SMG-Tulsa, LLC	Alternative rock
KMZE	92.3 FM	Woodward	FM 92 Broadcasters, Inc.	News-Talk
KNED	1150 AM	McAlester	Southeastern Oklahoma Radio, LLC	Classic country
KNGM	88.9 FM	Guymon	Great Plains Christian Radio, Inc.	Christian adult contemporary/Christian Talk and Teaching
KNID	107.1 FM	North Enid	Chisholm Trail Broadcasting Co.	Country
KNNU	92.3 FM	Antlers	Payne 1 Communications LLC	Country
KNYD	90.5 FM	Broken Arrow	David Ingles Ministries Church Inc.	Religious
KOCD	101.5 FM	Okeene	Calvario Communications, LLC	Spanish religious
KOCU	90.1 FM	Altus	Cameron University	Public radio
KOEG	88.3 FM	Walters	Oklahoma Catholic Broadcasting, Inc.	Catholic
KOFM	103.1 FM	Enid	Williams Broadcasting LLC	Country
KOGD-LP	107.1 FM	Shawnee	Benedictine Fathers of Sacred Heart Mission, Inc.	Catholic
KOKB	1580 AM	Blackwell	Team Radio, LLC	News/Talk/Sports (FSR)
KOKC	1520 AM	Oklahoma City	Tyler Media, L.L.C.	News/Talk
KOKF	90.9 FM	Edmond	Educational Media Foundation	Air1 / Worship music
KOKL	1240 AM	Okmulgee	Third Day Broadcasting, Inc.	Classic hits
KOKP	1020 AM	Perry	Team Radio, L.L.C.	News/Talk/Sports (FSR)
KOKQ	94.7 FM	Oklahoma City	iHM Licenses, LLC	Classic rock
KOKT-LP	90.9 FM	Tulsa	Electron Benders	Variety
KOMA	92.5 FM	Oklahoma City	Tyler Media, L.L.C.	Classic hits
KOMS	107.3 FM	Poteau	Cumulus Licensing LLC	Classic country
KOSB	105.1 FM	Perry	Team Radio, L.L.C.	Sports (FSR)
KOSG	103.9 FM	Pawhuska	South Central Oklahoma Christian Broadcasting, Inc.	Southern gospel
KOSN	107.5 FM	Ketchum	Oklahoma State University	NPR / News/Talk / Adult album alternative
KOSR	88.3 FM	Stillwater	Oklahoma State University	NPR / News/Talk / Adult Album Alternative
KOSU	91.7 FM	Stillwater	Oklahoma State University	NPR / News/Talk / Adult album alternative
KOTV	1170 AM	Tulsa	Griffin Licensing, L.L.C.	All-news radio
KOUA	91.9 FM	Ada	The University of Oklahoma	NPR / News/Talk / Jazz/Blues
KOUJ-LP	107.1 FM	Norman	Calvary Chapel Of Norman, Incorporated	Christian rock
KPCG-LP	101.3 FM	Edmond	Philadelphia Church Of God, Inc.	Religious
KPFS-LP	100.7 FM	Elk City	Western Oklahoma Catholic Faith Foundation	Catholic
KPGM	1500 AM	Pawhuska	Potter Radio, LLC	Sports (WWLS/FSR)
KPIM-LP	102.9 FM	Broken Arrow	Broken Arrow Catholic Radio, Inc.	Catholic
KPNC	100.7 FM	Ponca City	Team Radio, L.L.C.	Country
KPOP	94.3 FM	Hartshorne	Heartbeat Oklahoma LLC	Contemporary Christian
KPRO	93.5 FM	Altus	James G Boles Jr.	Rock
KPRV	1280 AM	Poteau	Leroy Billy	Adult standards
KPRV-FM	92.5 FM	Heavener	Leroy Billy	Classic hits/Classic country
KQCV	800 AM	Oklahoma City	Bott Broadcasting Company	Bott Radio Network / Christian Talk
KQCV-FM	95.1 FM	Shawnee	Community Broadcasting, Inc.	Bott Radio Network / Christian Talk
KQIB	102.9 FM	Idabel	JL Radio LLC	Classic hits
KQIK-FM	105.9 FM	Haileyville	Will Payne	Country
KQOB	96.9 FM	Enid	Champlin Broadcasting, Inc.	Conservative talk
KQOU	89.1 FM	Clinton	The University of Oklahoma	NPR / News/Talk / Jazz/Blues
KQPD	91.1 FM	Ardmore	American Family Association	American Family Radio / Inspirational
KQSN	104.7 FM	Ponca City	Sterling Broadcasting LLC	Country
KQTZ	105.9 FM	Hobart	James G Boles Jr.	Hot adult contemporary
KRAV-FM	102.3 FM	Sand Springs	Zoellner Media Group LLC	Hot adult contemporary
KRDR	105.7 FM	Alva	Blue Sky Media, LLC	Classic hits
KREF	1400 AM	Norman	Metro Radio Group, LLC	Sports (FSR)
KREK	104.9 FM	Bristow	Family Worship Center Church, Inc.	Religious
KREU	92.3 FM	Roland	Star 92 Co.	Spanish variety
KRGU-LP	97.7 FM	Midwest City	Midwest City Knights of Columbus Building Corporation	Catholic Spanish
KRIG-FM	104.9 FM	Nowata	KCD Enterprises, Inc.	Country
KRMG	740 AM	Tulsa	Zoellner Media Group LLC	News/Talk
KRMG-FM	96.5 FM	Tulsa	Zoellner Media Group LLC	News/Talk
KRMP	1140 AM	Oklahoma City	Perry Broadcasting Company, Inc.	Urban adult contemporary
KROU	105.7 FM	Spencer	The University of Oklahoma	NPR / News/Talk / Jazz/Blues
KRSC-FM	91.3 FM	Claremore	Board of Regents of The University of Oklahoma/Rogers State	Variety
KRQV	92.9 FM	Tulsa	Griffin Licensing, L.L.C.	Classic hits
KRXO	1270 AM	Claremore	Tyler Media LLC	Spanish CHR
KRXO-FM	107.7 FM	Oklahoma City	Tyler Media, L.L.C.	Sports (SM)
KSEO	750 AM	Durant	Mid-Continental Broadcasting, LLC	Classic hits
KSIW	1450 AM	Woodward	Classic Communications, Inc.	Sports (WWLS)
KSLE	104.7 FM	Wewoka	One Ten Broadcasting Group, Inc.	Oldies
KSMJ-LP	100.9 FM	Edmond	Oklahoma Fellowship of Catholic Men	Catholic
KSOC	94.5 FM	Tipton	Brazos TV, Inc.	Christian
KSPI	780 AM	Stillwater	Stillwater Broadcasting, LLC	Adult hits
KSPI-FM	93.7 FM	Stillwater	Stillwater Broadcasting, LLC	Hot adult contemporary
KSSO	89.3 FM	Norman	Family Worship Center Church, Inc.	Religious
KSSU	91.9 FM	Durant	Southeastern Oklahoma State University	Top 40 (CHR)
KSTQ	93.5 FM	Stuart	K95.5 Inc	Country
KTBT	92.1 FM	Broken Arrow	iHM Licenses, LLC	Top 40 (CHR)
KTBZ	1430 AM	Tulsa	iHM Licenses, LLC	Sports (ISN)
KTFR	100.5 FM	Chelsea	Key Plus Broadcasting, LLC	Spanish CHR
KTFX-FM	101.7 FM	Warner	K95.5, Inc	Country
KTGS	88.3 FM	Tishomingo	South Central Oklahoma Christian Broadcasting, Inc.	Southern gospel
KTGX	106.1 FM	Owasso	iHM Licenses, LLC	Country
KTHF	89.9 FM	Hammon	The Love Station, Inc.	Contemporary Christian
KTHL	89.3 FM	Altus	The Love Station, Inc.	Contemporary Christian
KTHM	94.1 FM	Waynoka	The Love Station, Inc.	Contemporary Christian
KTIJ	106.9 FM	Elk City	Fuchs Radio, LLC	Top 40 (CHR)
KTJS	1420 AM	Hobart	Fuchs Radio, LLC	Country
KTKL	88.5 FM	Stigler	Educational Media Foundation	K-Love / Contemporary Christian
KTLQ	1350 AM	Tahlequah	Payne 5 Communications, LLC	Classic country
KTLR	890 AM	Oklahoma City	Tyler Media, L.L.C.	Religious talk
KTLS-FM	106.5 FM	Holdenville	The Chickasaw Nation	Classic rock
KTLV	1220 AM	Midwest City	First Choice Broadcasting, Inc.	Black gospel
KTMC	1400 AM	McAlester	Southeastern Oklahoma Radio, LLC	Adult contemporary
KTMC-FM	105.1 FM	McAlester	Southeastern Oklahoma Radio, LLC	Classic rock
KTNG	97.3 FM	Connerville	The Chickasaw Nation	Community radio
KTNT	102.5 FM	Eufaula	K95.5, Inc.	Country
KTOK	1000 AM	Oklahoma City	iHM Licenses, LLC	News/Talk
KTRX	92.7 FM	Dickson	SMG-Ardmore, LLC	Hot adult contemporary
KTSO	100.9 FM	Sapulpa	KXOJ, Inc.	Soft oldies
KTST	101.9 FM	Oklahoma City	iHM Licenses, LLC	Country
KTUA	88.1 FM	Coweta	Educational Media Foundation	Air1 / Worship music
KTUZ	1570 AM	Catoosa	Tyler Media LLC	Regional Mexican
KTUZ-FM	106.7 FM	Okarche	Tyler Broadcasting Corporation	Regional Mexican
KUCO	90.1 FM	Edmond	The University of Central Oklahoma	Classical
KUSH	1600 AM	Cushing	Oil Patch Radio, Inc.	Full service
KVAZ	91.5 FM	Henryetta	South Central Oklahoma Christian Broadcasting, Inc.	Southern gospel
KVBN-LP	99.9 FM	Enid	Victory Bible Church, Inc.	Religious Teaching
KVIS	910 AM	Miami	Taylor Made Broadcasting Network, LLC	Southern gospel
KVOO-FM	98.5 FM	Tulsa	Griffin Licensing, L.L.C.	Country
KVRO	101.1 FM	Stillwater	Stillwater Broadcasting, LLC	Classic hits
KVRS	90.3 FM	Lawton	American Family Association	American Family Radio / Religious Talk
KVRW	107.3 FM	Lawton	Townsquare License, LLC	Top 40 (CHR)
KVSO	1240 AM	Ardmore	SMG-Ardmore, LLC	Sports (WWLS/ESPN)
KVSP	103.5 FM	Anadarko	Perry Broadcasting of Southwest Oklahoma, Inc.	Mainstream Urban
KWCO-FM	105.5 FM	Chickasha	Mollman Media, Inc.	Classic hits
KWDQ	102.3 FM	Woodward	Classic Communications, Inc.	Active rock
KWDW-LP	93.9 FM	Oklahoma City	Jesucristo ES Mi Fortaleza Church Inc	Religious Spanish
KWEN	95.5 FM	Tulsa	Zoellner Media Group LLC	Country
KWEY	1590 AM	Weatherford	Wright Broadcasting Systems, Inc.	Classic country
KWEY-FM	95.5 FM	Clinton	Wright Broadcasting Systems, Inc	Country
KWFF	99.7 FM	Mustang	Champlin Broadcasting, Inc.	Country
KWFX	100.1 FM	Woodward	Classic Communications, Inc.	Country
KWGS	89.5 FM	Tulsa	The University of Tulsa	Public radio
KWHW	1450 AM	Altus	James G Boles Jr.	Country
KWKL	89.9 FM	Grandfield	Educational Media Foundation	K-Love / Contemporary Christian
KWLB	93.1 FM	Red Oak	Eastern Oklahoma State College	Variety
KWOF	106.3 FM	Waukomis	Chisholm Trail Broadcasting Co	Classic Country
KWON	1400 AM	Bartlesville	KCD Enterprises, Inc.	News/Talk
KWOU	88.1 FM	Woodward	The University of Oklahoma	NPR / News/Talk / Jazz/Blues
KWOX	101.1 FM	Woodward	Omni Communications, Inc.	Country
KWPN	640 AM	Moore	Radio License Holding CBC, LLC	Sports (ESPN)
KWPV	104.5 FM	Wynnewood	The Chickasaw Nation	Community radio
KWSH	1260 AM	Wewoka	One Ten Broadcasting Group, Inc.	Country
KWTU	88.7 FM	Tulsa	The University of Tulsa	Classical
KWXC	88.9 FM	Grove	Grove Broadcasting Inc.	Christian talk
KXBL	99.5 FM	Henryetta	Griffin Licensing, L.L.C.	Classic country
KXCA	1050 AM	Lawton	Mollman Media, Inc.	Alternative rock
KXFC	105.5 FM	Coalgate	The Chickasaw Nation	Top 40 (CHR)
KXLS	95.7 FM	Lahoma	Chisholm Trail Broadcasting Co.	Adult contemporary
KXMX	105.1 FM	Muldrow	G2 Media Group LLC	Variety
KXOJ-FM	94.1 FM	Glenpool	SMG-Tulsa, LLC	Christian adult contemporary
KXOO	94.3 FM	Elk City	Paragon Communications, Inc.	Classic hits
KXRT	90.9 FM	Idabel	American Family Association	American Family Radio / Religious Talk
KXTD	1530 AM	Wagoner	Key Plus Broadcasting, LLC	Regional Mexican
KXTH	89.1 FM	Seminole	The Love Station, Inc.	Contemporary Christian
KXXY-FM	96.1 FM	Oklahoma City	iHM Licenses, LLC	Classic country
KYAL	1550 AM	Sapulpa	KXOJ, Inc.	Sports (WWLS/ESPN)
KYAL-FM	97.1 FM	Muskogee	KMMY Inc.	Sports (FSR)
KYBE	95.7 FM	Frederick	High Plains Radio Network, LLC	Classic country
KYFM	100.1 FM	Bartlesville	KCD Enterprises, Inc.	Adult contemporary
KYHD	94.7 FM	Valliant	Payne, Will	Classic country
KYIS	98.9 FM	Oklahoma City	Radio License Holding CBC, LLC	Hot adult contemporary
KYKC	100.1 FM	Byng	The Chickasaw Nation	Country
KYLV	88.9 FM	Oklahoma City	Educational Media Foundation	K-Love / Contemporary Christian
KYNZ	107.1 FM	Lone Grove	SMG-Ardmore, LLC	Classic hits
KYOA	98.7 FM	Kiowa	K95.5 Inc	Country
KZBB	97.9 FM	Poteau	iHM Licenses, LLC	Hot adult contemporary
KZBS	104.3 FM	Granite	BCvision	Regional Mexican
KZCD	94.1 FM	Lawton	Townsquare License, LLC	Mainstream rock
KZDV	99.5 FM	Rattan	Will Payne	Contemporary Christian
KZIG	107.5 FM	Wapanucka	Keystone Broadcasting Corporation	Classic rock
KZLF	97.5 FM	Alva	Running Wolf Radio LLC	Classic hits
KZLS	1640 AM	Enid	Chisholm Trail Broadcasting Co.	Sports (FSR)
KZRC	96.1 FM	Bennington	Keystone Broadcasting Corporation	Hot adult contemporary
KZTH	88.5 FM	Piedmont	The Love Station, Inc.	Contemporary Christian
KZUC-LP	99.3 FM	Edmond	UCentral Student Radio - University of Central Oklahoma	Top 40 (CHR)
KZUE	1460 AM	El Reno	La Tremenda Radio Mexico, Inc.	Spanish variety
KZZG-LP	106.9 FM	Hugo	Goodland Academy	Variety
KZZW	104.5 FM	Mooreland	Great Plains Christian Radio, Inc.	Top 40 (CHR)
WBBZ	1230 AM	Ponca City	Sterling Broadcasting, LLC	News/talk
WKY	930 AM	Oklahoma City	Radio License Holding CBC, LLC	Sports (WWLS/ESPN)
WWLS-FM	98.1 FM	The Village	Radio License Holding CBC, LLC	Sports (WWLS Flagship/ESPN)

== Defunct ==
- KAMG-LP
- KEIF-LP
- KHVJ-LP
- KIOP
- KJRM-LP
- KJZT-LP
- KKRE
- KLGB-LP
- KMAC
- KMFO-LP
- KNFB
- KONZ
- KPOP-LP
- KPSU
- KTAT
- KVWO-LP
- KZPY-LP
- KWPR

== See also ==
- Oklahoma media
  - List of newspapers in Oklahoma
  - List of television stations in Oklahoma
  - Media of locales in Oklahoma: Broken Arrow, Lawton, Norman, Oklahoma City, Tulsa

== Bibliography ==
- Jack Alicoate, ed. (1939), "Oklahoma", Radio Annual, New York: Radio Daily, OCLC 2459636 – via Internet Archive
- "AM Stations in the U.S.: Oklahoma", Radio Annual Television Year Book, New York: Radio Television Daily, 1963, OCLC 10512375 – via Internet Archive
- Gene Allen. Voices On the Wind: Early Radio in Oklahoma (Oklahoma City: Oklahoma Heritage Association, 1993).

== Images ==
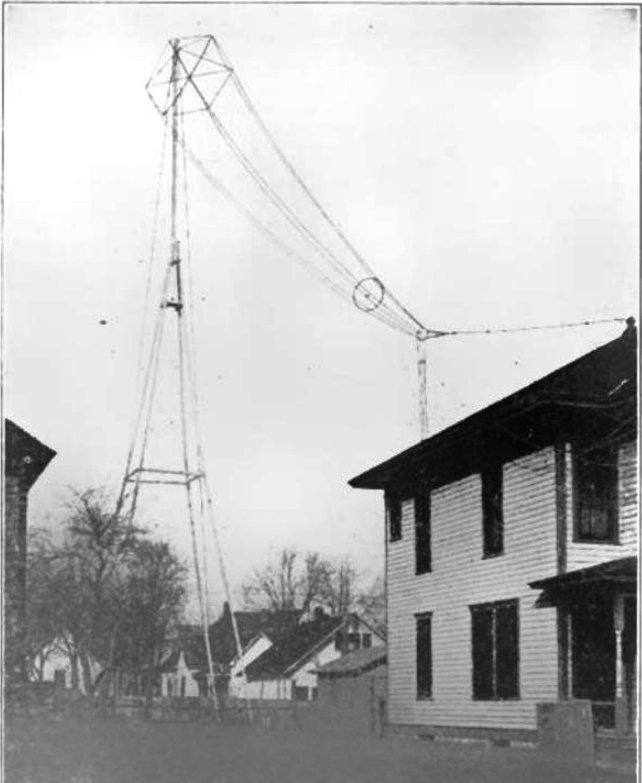
Antenna of amateur radio station, Oklahoma City, 1922

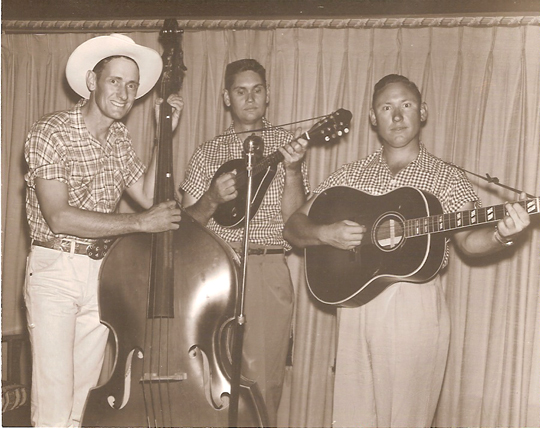
Olen and The Bluegrass Travelers at KCES FM radio, Eufaula, Oklahoma, 1950

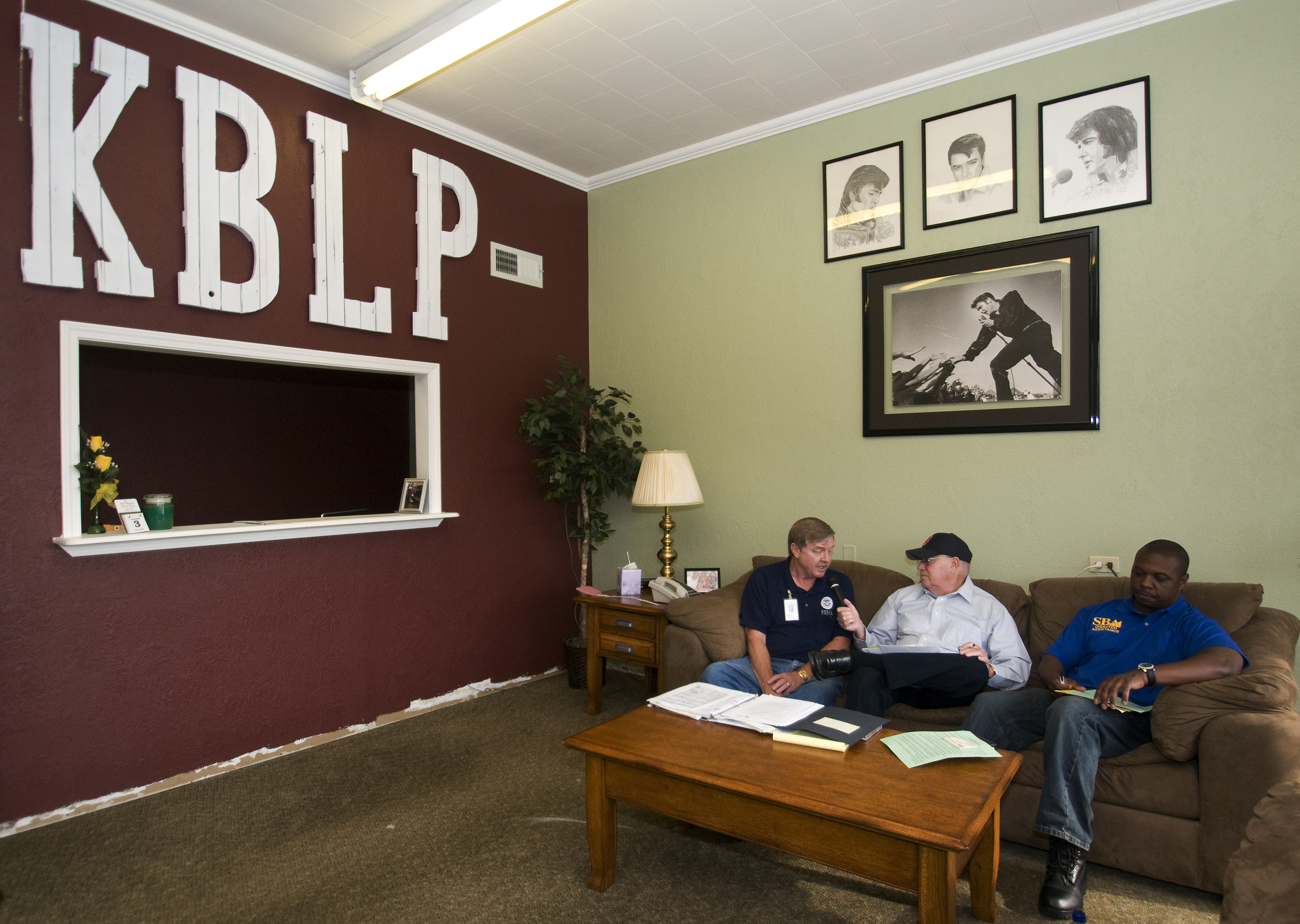
KBLP radio, 2010
