= KOCY-LD =

Television station in Oklahoma City

- Oklahoma City, Oklahoma; United States
- Channels: Digital: 14 (UHF); Virtual: 48
- Branding: Estrella TV 48

Programming
- Affiliations: Estrella TV

Ownership
- Owner: Tyler Media Group; (Tyler Media LLC)
- Sister stations: TV: KUOK, KTUZ-TV; Radio: KTUZ-FM, KJKE, KEBC, KRXO-AM, KRXO-FM, KMGL, KOMA, KOKC

History
- First air date: 1989
- Former call signs: K69EK (1989–2005); KWDW-LP (2005–2011); KUOK-LP (2011–2012); KOCY-LP (2012–2022)
- Former channel number: Analog: 69 (UHF, 1989–2007), 48 (UHF, 2007–2022)
- Former affiliations: Independent (1989–1995); The WB (1995–1996); WHT (1996–2000); The Shepherd's Chapel Network (2000–2002); MTV2 (2002–2004); Univision (as a translator of KUOK, 2004–2012)
- Call sign meaning: Oklahoma City

Technical information
- Licensing authority: FCC
- Facility ID: 36850
- Class: LD
- ERP: 15 kW
- HAAT: 168.9 m (554 ft)
- Transmitter coordinates: 35°24′54.4″N 97°30′33.1″W
- Translator(s): KUOK 48.1 Woodward

Links
- Public license information: LMS
- Website: unidosok.com/okc/estrella/

KOCY-LD (channel 48) is a low-power television station in Oklahoma City, Oklahoma, United States, affiliated with the Spanish-language network Estrella TV. It is owned by locally based Tyler Media Group alongside Woodward-licensed Univision affiliate KUOK (channel 36) and Shawnee-licensed Telemundo affiliate KTUZ-TV (channel 30). The three stations share studios near Southeast 51st Street and Shields Boulevard in southern Oklahoma City, where KOCY-LD's transmitter is also located.

== History ==
The station first signed on the air in 1989 as K69EK, broadcasting on UHF channel 69 as an independent station. In 1995, the station joined The WB upon the network's launch until 1996. From the mid-1990s until 2000, the station carried programming from LeSea Broadcasting-owned general entertainment/religious network World Harvest Television; for the next two years afterward, it ran religious programming from The Shepherd's Chapel Network. It then switched to a music video format as an affiliate of MTV2 from 2002 to 2004.

After being acquired by Equity Broadcasting Corporation, the station became a Univision affiliate on May 8, 2004, as one of three Oklahoma-licensed translator stations of the then six-station two-state network "Univision Arkansas-Oklahoma", with Woodward-based KUOK (channel 35) as its Oklahoma flagship. KUOK, K69EK and three low-power stations that Equity also acquired to become KUOK's translators (KCHM-LP channel 36, now KUOK-CD; Sulphur-based KOKT-LP channel 20; and KUTU-CA channel 25 in Tulsa), originally relayed Univision programming across portions of Oklahoma via a simulcast from then-sister station KLRA-LP (channel 58) in Little Rock, Arkansas. Prior to this, Univision was only receivable via local cable providers such as Cox Communications, which carried its programming from the Spanish language network's national feed; that feed was eventually replaced by a direct-from-studio fiber optic feed of KUOK (whose schedule now mirrors the national feed outside of local advertising, news inserts and occasional paid programming substitutions, and provided improved reception of the station throughout the market than that receivable over-the-air prior to the digital transition).

In the first months of operation, the Univision Oklahoma stations ran a direct simulcast from KLRA-LP including local commercials from the Little Rock area that were inserted by that station during national commercial breaks and its station identification slides (the Oklahoma City repeaters identified through text-only IDs placed at the bottom of the screen during the top and bottom of each hour). In March 2005, K69EK, though still programmed via satellite from Equity's headquarters in Little Rock, ceased the KLRA-LP simulcast and became a direct simulcast of KUOK (which began operating its own separate feed), carrying advertising for businesses within the Oklahoma City market and separate station promotions. That same month on March 13, the station changed its callsign to KWDW-LP.

On June 25, 2008, Equity announced that it would sell KUOK, its low-power repeaters and KUTU to Luken Communications (owned by former Equity executive Henry Luken). That December, Equity Media Holdings filed for Chapter 11 bankruptcy protection; offers by Luken Communications to acquire Equity-owned stations in six markets were later withdrawn. KUOK and its translators were sold at auction to the Tyler Media Group on April 16, 2009; this effectively created a duopoly between KUOK and Telemundo affiliate KTUZ-TV (channel 30).

On November 22, 2011, the station changed its callsign to KUOK-LP (KUOK's translator on channel 36, changed its callsign to KUOK-LD around the same time), then on February 9, 2012, the call letters were changed again to KOCY-LP (the KOCY callsign had previously been used on Tyler-owned radio station KEBC (1560 AM) from 2003 to 2011, and on KGHM (1340 AM) from the 1940s until the early 1990s); it also replaced the KUOK simulcast with programming from Estrella TV; as such, it became Tyler Media's third (separate) Spanish-language station in the Oklahoma City market.

On April 15, 2022, the station was licensed for digital operation, changing its call sign to KOCY-LD.

== Subchannel ==
Subchannel of KOCY-LD
| Channel | Res. | Short name | Programming |
|---|---|---|---|
| 48.1 | 1080i | KOCY | Estrella TV |
