= KTUZ-TV =

Television station in Shawnee, Oklahoma

- Shawnee–Oklahoma City, Oklahoma; United States
- City: Shawnee, Oklahoma
- Channels: Digital: 29 (UHF); Virtual: 30
- Branding: Telemundo 30 Oklahoma City; Noticiero Oklahoma (news)

Programming
- Affiliations: 30.1: Telemundo; 36.1: Univision; for others, see § Subchannels

Ownership
- Owner: Tyler Media Group; (Tyler Media LLC)
- Sister stations: TV: KUOK, KOCY-LD; Radio: KEBC, KJKE, KMGL, KOKC, KOMA, KRXO-FM, KTUZ-FM

History
- First air date: November 10, 2000
- Former call signs: KQOK (2000–2004)
- Former channel number: Analog: 30 (UHF, 2000–2009)
- Former affiliations: Jewelry TV (2000–2004)
- Call sign meaning: Derived from sister station KTUZ-FM

Technical information
- Licensing authority: FCC
- Facility ID: 77480
- ERP: 1,000 kW
- HAAT: 474 m (1,555 ft)
- Transmitter coordinates: 35°33′36.9″N 97°29′7.6″W

Links
- Public license information: Public file; LMS
- Website: www.telemundooklahoma.com

KTUZ-TV (channel 30) is a television station licensed to Shawnee, Oklahoma, United States, serving the Oklahoma City area as an affiliate of the Spanish-language network Telemundo. It is the flagship station of locally based Tyler Media Group, and is co-owned with Woodward-licensed Univision affiliate KUOK, channel 36 (and its Oklahoma City-based Class A translator KUOK-CD), and low-power Estrella TV affiliate KOCY-LD (channel 48). The stations share studios near Southeast 51st Street and Shields Boulevard in south Oklahoma City, while KTUZ-TV's transmitter is located near 86th Street and Ridgeway Road (south of Britton Road) in northeast Oklahoma City.

== History ==
A construction permit application to build a television station on UHF channel 30 was submitted to the Federal Communications Commission (FCC) by a group called OKC-30 Television, LLC on July 30, 1996, with the callsign KAQS assigned to the license on September 27. The station's callsign was later changed to KQOK on August 17, 2000. The station signed on the air three months later on November 10, branded as "OK30", under the ownership of Little Rock–based Equity Broadcasting Corporation. Under Equity ownership, the station held a primary affiliation with home shopping channel America's Collectibles Network (now Jewelry Television), and also carried some religious programs and children's television series compliant with the FCC's educational programming guidelines. For a brief period, KQOK also aired reruns of the classic western series Bonanza and national newscasts produced by the Independent News Network.

Former logo, used from February 2005 to December 7, 2012.

In early 2004, Equity Broadcasting acquired KUOK (channel 35) in Woodward, and low-power stations KCHM-LP (channel 36, now KUOK-CD) and K69EK (channel 69, now Estrella TV affiliate KOCY-LD on channel 48) in Oklahoma City, and KOKT-LP (channel 20, now defunct) in Sulphur. On May 27 of that year, Equity sold KQOK to Oklahoma City-based Tyler Media Group, becoming the company's first television station property. Under Tyler Media, channel 30 became a Telemundo affiliate on December 27, 2004; the station's affiliation switch had been delayed from an original target date of December 1. Equity had earlier switched the affiliations of KUOK and the low-power stations in Oklahoma City and Sulphur to Univision on May 8, converting the latter three stations into translator stations of KUOK. The station's callsign was also changed to KTUZ-TV (after its sister radio station KTUZ-FM [106.7 FM], which maintained a Regional Mexican music format). To accommodate the station's plans to launch local programming catering to Oklahoma's Latino community, Tyler Media expanded the company's existing Shields Boulevard facility, constructing two production studios for use for KTUZ's news and public affairs programming, and a third, larger studio for varied usage, including possible use for town hall events. The company also hired around ten employees to help manage KTUZ-TV's operations.

Prior to the analog television shutdown, KTUZ-TV's analog and digital signal patterns offered different coverage across Central Oklahoma; the station's analog transmitter was located near SE 179th and East Westminster Drive in northeastern Cleveland County, near Moore. It provided city-grade coverage to Norman and Moore, but only provided "rimshot" coverage to Oklahoma City proper. Its analog signal was marginal at best in central portions of the city (especially in suburbs such as Forest Park, Nichols Hills and Spencer), and could not be seen at all in many of the northern suburbs (such as Edmond). Despite this, the station did not offer a low-power repeater to give it a city-grade signal throughout the immediate Oklahoma City area. The digital signal, however, provides city-grade coverage to the entire Oklahoma City metropolitan area as that transmitter is located in the northeast side of the city, where most of the market's television stations maintain their transmitters.

On April 16, 2009, in a bankruptcy auction held by Equity Media Holdings following the withdrawal of an offer to sell the stations and Equity-owned stations in five other markets to Luken Communications, Tyler acquired KUOK and its translator stations for $800,000, which created a duopoly with KTUZ-TV and the third television duopoly in the Oklahoma City market (after the combinations of NBC affiliate KFOR-TV [channel 4] and then-MyNetworkTV affiliate KAUT-TV [channel 43, now a CW owned-and-operated station] and Fox affiliate KOKH-TV [channel 25] and then-CW affiliate KOCB [channel 34, now an independent station]). The deal, which was approved by the FCC on July 1, placed KUOK in the unique position of being the junior partner in a duopoly with a Telemundo-affiliated station, a rarity given that Univision is the longer established and, on a national level, higher rated of the two networks.

== Programming ==
=== Local programming ===
In addition to airing Telemundo network programming and newscasts, KTUZ also airs some locally produced programs: the station produces a weekly discussion program Nuestra Oklahoma (Our Oklahoma), airing Sundays at 11 a.m. with an encore presentation at 11 p.m. It also airs a local sports show on Saturday nights (similar in format to Telemundo's Ritmo Deportivo) called Fiesta Deportiva, airing immediately following Telemundo's national sports program Titulares Telemundo at 10:30 p.m.

From the 2005 affiliation switch until September 2007, the station also aired Studio Z (produced in conjunction with KTUZ-FM), a weekly music video program hosted by KTUZ-FM personality Blanca Estela Ramirez, showcasing videos from Latin music artists. In September 2007, KTUZ-TV and KTUZ-FM became the first Spanish-language stations to simulcast college football games in Spanish, when both aired a University of Oklahoma football game.

KTUZ has tended to preempt more Telemundo programming than other affiliates; the network's weekend schedule is more susceptible to this. Until November 2011, KTUZ preempted Nitido on Saturday mornings and Fotogenicas on Sunday mornings (though the latter show aired on the station for two weeks in October 2009; the actual preemption was problematic since on Sundays when Telemundo scheduled a soccer match, the first five minutes of Ritmo Deportivo were cut off as Telemundo moved the start times of programs that aired before the games back five minutes) as well as the Sunday edition of Titulares Telemundo and the network's early late-night movie; however with the exception of the Sunday Titulares Telemundo telecast (for an encore presentation of Nuestra Oklahoma and the preemption of the Sunday evening telecast of the home video show Camara Loca, since replaced by Operacíon Repo, for Fiesta Deportiva); for the most part, KTUZ preempted these programs mainly for infomercials. The station's preemptions today are not as prevalent, and are now only done mainly to broadcast locally produced shows and religious programs, although KTUZ-TV does replace Telemundo's overnight informercial block with Spanish-dubbed infomercials that the station itself leases time to air.

=== News operation ===
KTUZ-TV presently broadcasts five hours of locally produced newscasts each week (all airing only on weekdays). KTUZ, along with KAUT-TV (whose newscasts are produced by KFOR-TV) are the only stations in the Oklahoma City market with weekday-only newscasts. After switching to Telemundo, KTUZ had no full-fledged newscasts other than two-minute daily news and weather updates that were produced out of a small studio which aired during the network's daytime and primetime programs. However, the station expressed interest in airing regular newscasts from the affiliation switch. One of the anchors seen in these updates was Flory Mata (later the host of the local entertainment/lifestyle program Estilo Latino on KUOK).

KTUZ's news operation, originally branded as T30 Noticias, began in October 2006. In its news department's beginnings, the station only ran a weeknight 10 p.m. newscast (anchored by Carlos Toledo, who also served as the station's first news director), with programming supplied by Telemundo continuing to air in the early evenings. A 5 p.m. newscast was added in early 2007. The newscasts initially used a logo that was radically different from the station's network-standardized logo, but a new graphics package was instituted in September 2007 with a logo more closely aligned with the station's regular branding.

In August 2011, the station's newscasts were rebranded as Acción Oklahoma (a variant of the Action News branding); with the change, the station introduced a new set and graphics for its newscasts. In August 2013, Tyler Media appointed Martin Bedoya as news director for the program, who intended to improve the quality of Acción Oklahoma's content as well as the station's newsroom operations. On March 26, 2016, following the expansion of the national newscast Noticiero Telemundo, to weekends, KTUZ launched half-hour editions of Acción Oklahoma on Saturdays and Sundays at 4:30 p.m. and 10:30 p.m. (on November 19, 2016, coinciding with Noticiero Telemundo's timeslot shift, the Saturday edition of the early evening newscast was moved to 5 p.m.; the weekend edition of the late newscast was moved to 10 p.m. in February 2017).

== Technical information ==
=== Subchannels ===
The station's signal is multiplexed:

Subchannels of KTUZ-TV
| Channel | Res. | Short name | Programming |
|---|---|---|---|
| 30.1 | 1080i | KTUZ | Telemundo |
| 30.2 | 480i | QVC | QVC |
| 30.3 | 480i | HSN 2 | HSN2 |
| 30.4 | 480i | QVC-2 | QVC2 |
| 30.5 | 480i | MovSph | MovieSphere Gold |
| 30.6 | 480i | StartTV | Start TV |
| 30.7 | 480i | MeToons | MeTV Toons |
| 36.1 | 1080i | KUOK | Univision (KUOK/KUOK-CD) |
| 36.2 | 1080i | Unimas | UniMás (KUOK/KUOK-CD) |

Simulcast of subchannels of another station

On August 9, 2021, KTUZ-TV launched three digital subchannels—the first programmed by Channel 30 outside of simulcasts of its sister stations—affiliated with home shopping networks: QVC on virtual channel 30.2, HSN on virtual channel 30.3 and QVC2 on virtual channel 30.4, with the latter inadvertently running the same programming as KTUZ-DT2 until QVC2 was placed on the subchannel on August 12. (KTUZ assumed the full-power affiliation rights to QVC and HSN from Ion affiliate KOPX-TV [channel 62], which had displaced them in favor of Defy TV and TrueReal on their respective 62.5 and 62.6 subchannels on June 30, the day prior to the latter two Scripps-owned networks' formal launches, temporarily leaving QVC and HSN without full-market over-the-air availability in the Oklahoma City DMA—beyond low-power affiliations—until the addition of the KTUZ subchannels.)

=== Analog-to-digital conversion ===
KTUZ-TV discontinued regular programming on its analog signal, over UHF channel 30, on June 12, 2009, as part of the federally mandated transition from analog to digital television. The station's digital signal remained on its pre-transition UHF channel 29, using virtual channel 30.
