= KTUZ =

KTUZ may refer to:

- KTUZ (AM), a radio station (1570 AM) licensed to serve Catoosa, Oklahoma, United States
- KTUZ-FM, a radio station (106.7 FM) licensed to serve Okarche, Oklahoma
- KTUZ-TV, a television station (channel 30) licensed to serve Shawnee, Oklahoma
- KRXO (AM), a radio station (1270 AM) licensed to serve Claremore, Oklahoma, which held the call sign KTUZ from 2014 to 2015
