= KWDW =

KWDW may refer to:

- KWDW-LP, a low-power radio station (93.9 FM) licensed to serve Oklahoma City, Oklahoma, United States
- KOCY-LD, a low-power television station (channel 14, virtual 48) licensed to serve Oklahoma City, Oklahoma, which held the call sign KWDW-LP from 2005 to 2011
