= KOCY =

KOCY may refer to:

- KOCY-LD, a low-power television station (channel 14, virtual 48) licensed to serve Oklahoma City, Oklahoma, United States
- KEBC, a radio station (1560 AM) licensed to serve Del City, Oklahoma, which held the call sign KOCY from 2003 to 2010
