= KOCD =

KOCD may refer to:

- KOCD (FM), a radio station (101.5 FM) licensed to serve Okeene, Oklahoma, United States
- KDKL (FM), a radio station (103.7 FM) licensed to serve Okemah, Oklahoma, which held the call sign KOCD from 2007 to 2011
