= KPSU =

KPSU may refer to:

- KPSU (FM), a defunct radio station (91.7 FM), formerly licensed to serve Goodwell, Oklahoma
- KPSU (Portland), student-run, internet-only station at Portland State University, Oregon
