= KCSC =

KCSC may refer to:

- Kalpetta Common Service Center, north kerala wayanad based common Service center in india
- Korea Communications Standards Commission, South Korea's Broadcasting and Internet communications review agency
- KCSC-FM, a radio station (95.9 FM) licensed to serve Woodward, Oklahoma, United States
- KCSC-LP, a low-power radio station (101.9 FM) licensed to serve Mukilteo, Washington, United States
- Kansas Cosmosphere and Space Center
