= KLGB =

KLGB may refer to:

- KLGB-LP, a defunct low-power radio station in Enid, Oklahoma, United States
- Long Beach Airport, California, United States, ICAO airport code KLGB
