= KSMJ =

KSMJ may refer to:

- KSMJ-LP, a low-power radio station (100.9 FM) licensed to serve Edmond, Oklahoma, United States
- KNZR-FM, a radio station (97.7 FM) licensed to serve Shafter, California, United States, which held the call sign KSMJ from 2001 to 2013
