= KZLI =

KZLI may refer to:

- KZLI-LP, a low-power radio station (107.3 FM) licensed to serve Little Rock, Arkansas, United States
- KTUZ (AM), a radio station (1570 AM) licensed to serve Catoosa, Oklahoma, United States, which held the call sign KZLI from 2007 to 2015
