= Tyler Media Group =

- Company type: Private
- Industry: Mass media
- Genre: Television broadcasting; Radio broadcasting; Outdoor advertising
- Founded: 1965; 61 years ago
- Founder: Ralph Tyler
- Headquarters: Oklahoma City, Oklahoma, United States
- Number of locations: 3
- Website: tylermedia.com

Tyler Media Group (also known as Tyler Broadcasting Corporation or simply Tyler Media) is an American family-owned media company with radio, TV and outdoor advertising assets in Oklahoma City (where its headquarters is) and Tulsa. Tyler Media owns five television stations (consisting of two Univision network affiliates, one Estrella TV affiliate and two Telemundo affiliates) and fourteen radio stations (ten English-language and four Spanish-language).

The company also operates an outdoor advertising company, Tyler Outdoor Advertising, and Tyler Media Digital, Tyler Media's marketing extension.

== History ==
The company was founded in 1965 by Ralph Tyler, when it purchased KEBC radio in Oklahoma City; Tyler owned the station for 14 years until 1986. Tyler re-entered the radio business in 1994 with the purchase of a station in Ada. Tyler Media entered the television industry in 2004 after it purchased Oklahoma City television station KQOK (channel 30). After the sale, Tyler Media converted the station into a Telemundo affiliate and recalled the station to KTUZ-TV after its new radio sister.

On April 16, 2009, Tyler purchased five affiliates of the Spanish-language network Univisión at an auction held by Equity Media Holdings, which was liquidating its assets that year due to bankruptcy. After the sale was approved by the FCC, this created a duopoly with KTUZ-TV. Equity had owned both stations at some point, KTUZ-TV was owned by Equity from sign-on until 2004 when Equity traded channel 30 to Tyler Media in exchange for KUOK.

On July 15, 2012, Tyler Media entered into an agreement with Renda Broadcasting to purchase that company's Oklahoma City radio cluster (KMGL, KOMA, KRXO and KOKC) for $40 million. In accordance to limits imposed by the Federal Communications Commission on the number of radio stations a single broadcasting entity can own in a single market, Tyler sold KTLR-AM/FM and KKNG to WPA Radio for $1.6 million.

In early 2017, Tyler Media launched its newest marketing extension called, Tyler Media Digital.

== Stations ==
=== Television ===
==== Current ====
City of license/Market	Station	Channel TV (RF)	Owned from	Affiliation
Shawnee, Oklahoma/Oklahoma City, Oklahoma	KTUZ-TV	30 (29)	2004	Telemundo
Woodward, Oklahoma	KUOK	35 (35)	2009	Univision
Oklahoma City, Oklahoma	KUOK-LD (repeater of KUOK)	36 (--)	2009	Univision
Oklahoma City, Oklahoma	KOCY-LD	48 (14)	2009	Estrella TV
Tulsa, Oklahoma	KUTU-CD	25 (17)	2009	Univision

==== Former ====
City of license/Market	Station	Channel TV (RF)	Owned from	Affiliation
Sulphur, Oklahoma	KOKT-LP (repeater of KUOK)	20 (--)	2009–2011	Univision

=== Radio ===
City of license	Call sign	Frequency	Current format
Del City, Oklahoma	KEBC	1560 AM	Sports
Newcastle, Oklahoma	KJKE	93.3 FM	Country Music
Okarche, Oklahoma	KTUZ-FM	106.7 FM	Regional Mexican
Oklahoma City, Oklahoma	KMGL	104.1 FM	Adult Contemporary
Oklahoma City, Oklahoma	KOKC	1520 AM	News Talk
Oklahoma City, Oklahoma	KOMA	92.5 FM	Classic Hits
Oklahoma City, Oklahoma	KRXO-FM	107.7 FM	Sports
Oklahoma City, Oklahoma	KTLR	890 AM	News Talk
Tulsa, Oklahoma	KRXO	1270 AM	Spanish CHR
Tulsa, Oklahoma	KTUZ	1570 AM	Regional Mexican

==== Translators ====
City of license	Frequency	Rebroadcasts	Current format
Norman, Oklahoma	103.3 FM	KEBC	Sports
Oklahoma City, Oklahoma	92.9 FM	KOMA-HD2	Alternative Rock
Oklahoma City, Oklahoma	95.3 FM	KOKC (AM)	News/Talk
Oklahoma City, Oklahoma	96.5 FM	KRXO-HD3	Spanish oldies
Oklahoma City, Oklahoma	103.1 FM	KOMA-HD3	Classic hip hop
Oklahoma City, Oklahoma	103.7 FM	KTLR	News/Talk
Oklahoma City, Oklahoma	104.5 FM	KRXO-HD2	Classic rock
Tulsa, Oklahoma	101.9 FM	KTUZ (AM)	Regional Mexican
Tulsa, Oklahoma	104.1 FM	KTUZ (AM)	Regional Mexican
Tulsa, Oklahoma	107.9 FM	KRXO (AM)	Spanish CHR
