= KTLR =

Radio station in Oklahoma City

Oklahoma City, Oklahoma; United States
- Broadcast area: Oklahoma City Metroplex
- Frequency: 890 kHz

Programming
- Format: Contemporary worship music
- Affiliations: Salem Radio Network

Ownership
- Owner: Tyler Media Group; (Tyler Media, L.L.C.)
- Sister stations: KEBC, KJKE, KMGL, KOKC, KOMA, KRXO-FM, KTUZ-FM

History
- First air date: January 1, 1978
- Former call signs: KKNG (1978-2000)
- Call sign meaning: Tyler (as in the owner)

Technical information
- Licensing authority: FCC
- Facility ID: 59366
- Class: D
- Power: 1,000 watts day
- Transmitter coordinates: 35°33′59″N 97°28′28″W
- Translator: 103.7 K279CR (Oklahoma City)

Links
- Public license information: Public file; LMS
- Webcast: Listen Live
- Website: ktlr.com

KTLR (890 AM) is a commercial radio station in Oklahoma City with a contemporary worship music format. The station is currently under ownership of Tyler Media Group, through licensee Tyler Media, L.L.C. Programming is supplied by Salem Radio Network's "Today's Worship Music" satellite network on weekdays and during off hours on weekends. Weekends consist of brokered programming in English and Spanish (mostly Religious), where hosts pay for time on the station, and can discuss products or services they sell.

KTLR broadcasts by day at 1,000 watts using a non-directional antenna. Because it shares the same frequency as Class A clear channel station WLS in Chicago, KTLR is a daytimer and must sign off at sunset to avoid interfering with WLS, because radio waves travel further at night. Programming can be heard around the clock on KTLR's FM translator station, K279CR, at 103.7 MHz.

== History ==
The station's original call sign was KBYE, signing on the air in 1945. It was one of OKC's first African-American formatted stations for many years. The tower, before moving to Britton Rd. and Eastern was located on the same property as Remington Park at approx. 55th and N. Eastern. The studio was located at 9th and Broadway downtown, where the Murrah Bombing site is now. Ownership for many years was by the Lynch brothers.

Under Tyler ownership, the station was then known as KKNG beginning in 1999. On August 30, 2008, the station changed its call sign to the current KTLR.

It carried an Urban Gospel format before making its switch to a talk format in 2007.

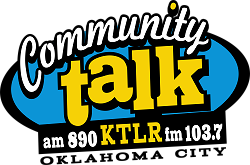
Previous logo

As of May 2024, KTLR dropped most of its talk programs with the shut down of Genesis Communications Network and switched to Salem Radio Network's "Today's Worship Music" national satellite feed. Weekends still feature brokered programming (mostly Religious) in English and Spanish while providing "Today's Worship Music" during off hours.

== Translators ==
Call sign	Frequency	City of license	FID	ERP (W)	HAAT	Class	FCC info
K279CR	103.7 MHz FM	Oklahoma City, Oklahoma	157276	99	253 m (830 ft)	D	LMS
