= KEIF-LP =

Coordinates: 36.396°N 97.878°W

KEIF
- United States
- Broadcast area: Enid, Oklahoma
- Frequency: 104.7 MHz
- Branding: 104.7 The Rocket Enid's Classic Rock Station

Programming
- Format: Defunct (formerly Public Radio)

Ownership
- Owner: Enid Public Radio Association

History
- First air date: May 26, 2000

Technical information
- Licensing authority: FCC
- Facility ID: 124554
- Class: L1
- ERP: 82 watts
- HAAT: 33.1 meters

Links
- Public license information: Public file; LMS

KEIF-LP 104.7 FM was a low-power non-commercial community radio station in Enid, Oklahoma. It broadcast classic rock, local news and weather, and specialty programs that feature blues and novelty songs. On March 18, 2013, the FCC rescinded the station's license due to a late renewal application and previous violations.

== History ==
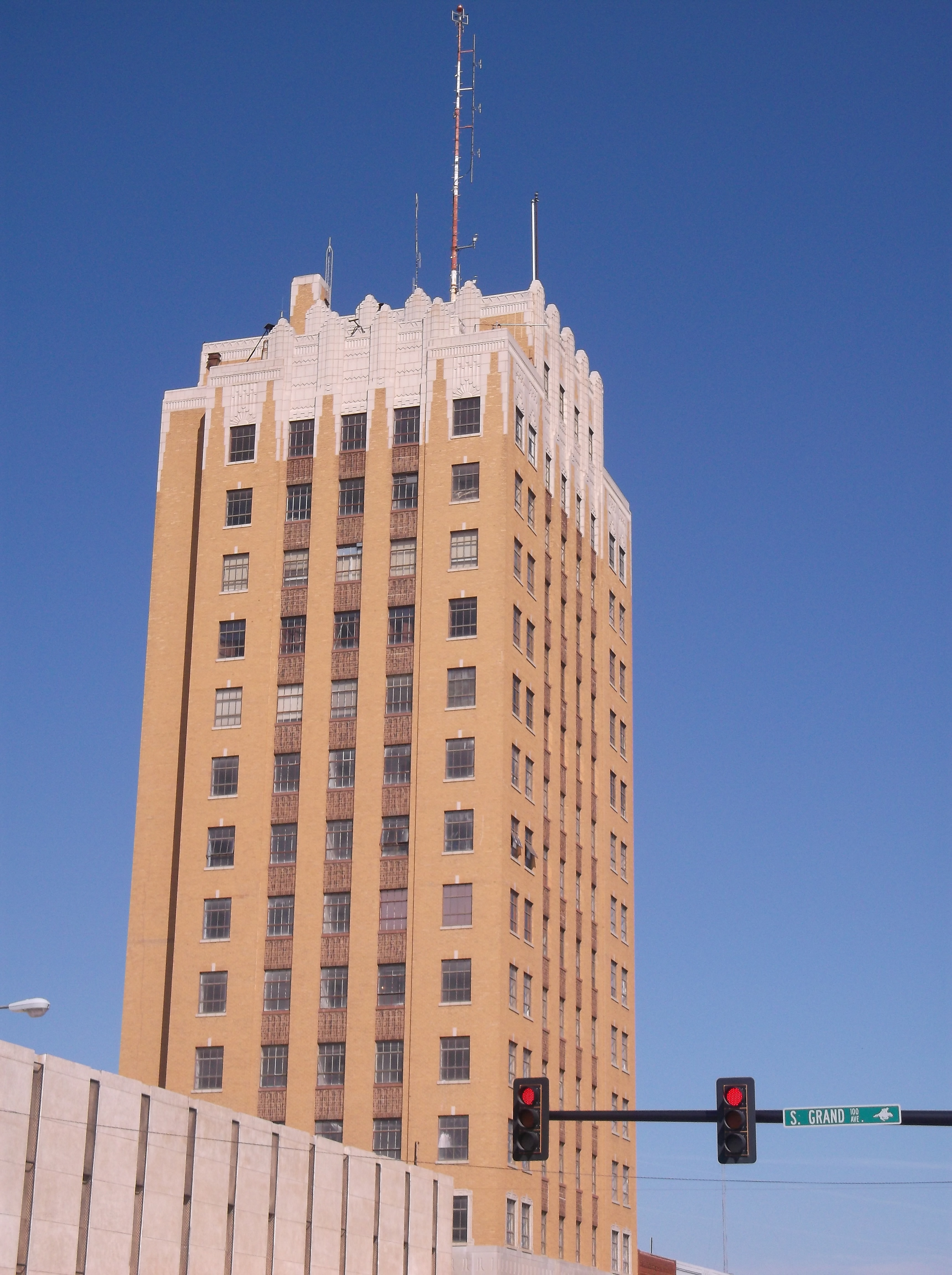
Radio antenna on Broadway Tower in Enid, Oklahoma

The Enid Public Radio Association was formed on May 26, 2000, to serve the traditional and non-traditional education needs of the citizens of Enid, Oklahoma. The intent of the station is to make time available to various educational, civic, governmental, and fine arts organizations to broadcast their respective programs. It founded KUAL-LP on June 11, 2001. The station changed its call sign to KEIF-LP on June 7, 2005.

In August 2004, the Federal Communications Commission (FCC) admonished the Enid Public Radio Association for broadcasting advertisements in 2002. No fine was issued at the time, and the station reported that it had implemented stricter underwriting policies. However, on May 2, 2005, Chisholm Trail Broadcasting Company filed a petition to prevent renewal of KEIF's licence. The petition focused on the following complaints:

Advertisements identical to those airing in 2004 continued to air in May 2007 that violated the FCC's guidelines "prohibiting comparative or qualitative descriptions of the donor’s products or services, calls to action, or inducements to buy, sell, rent, or lease." The FCC fined the station $5,000 on July 13, 2010.

KEIF's antenna mounted on the Broadway Tower had a height above average terrain (HAAT) of 61.94 meters, which is 22.82 meters higher than the authorized 33 meters for low-power stations and an effective radiated power (ERP) of 155 watts, which is 73 watts greater than the authorized wattage of 82 watts and 55 watts greater than the allowed maximum ERP of 100 watts. KEIF was fined an additional $5,000 for this violation on July 13, 2010.

Chisholm Trail's petition also alleged that an unauthorized transfer of control had taken place. Enid Public Radio's original board consisted of Bruce Sutherland, Carol Clark, Richard Cox, Ron Anderson, and Steve Allen. Cox and Allen resigned on July 5, 2002. The petition alleges that Scott Clark, the station's engineer, had "assumed a position on the board without having been approved". Statements by Cox regarding this lack of board approval were not presented under oath, and were therefore, rejected by the FCC. The FCC found that with each board member having a 20 percent influence on the votes of the board. With 40 percent vacant by the resignations of Cox and Allen, 60 percent, therefore, a majority voting stake, still belonged to original board members. Consequently, the FCC rejected this allegation, and no fines were issued.

The station's licence application was approved, expiring June 1, 2011. However, the approval was conditional as the station must pay its fines by August 13, 2010, and lower its antenna to 33 meters by October 13, 2010. It is also required to report information on underwriters and donors, operating logs, and transcripts of any on-air announcements which acknowledge donations of funds, services, or goods. Engineer Scott Clark was quoted as saying, "We’re not going off the air, ever."

On April 7, 2011, the FCC issued a forfeiture order against the Enid Public Radio association for failing to respond to the FCC regarding its original order in August 2010.

KEIF's license renewal application deadline was June 1, 2011. It was filed on February 27, 2013, and denied. On March 18, 2013, KEIF was notified by the FCC that its license was rescinded and all authority to operate was terminated for failure to comply with the conditions of its last renewal, which included moving the antenna down to the authorized height of 33 meters and "a list of all program underwriters and other persons or entities whose donations, payments, or contributions have been acknowledged on air during the 180-day period of the report; (b) a list of the times and dates of all on air announcements acknowledging donations, program underwriting, or other receipts of goods, services, or other consideration by Licensee; (c) the text of all on air announcements listed in response to item (b); and (d) operating logs indicating that the Station has been operating at all times in compliance with its authorization and all applicable Commission technical rules."
