= KOCD (FM) =

- Okeene, Oklahoma; United States
- Frequency: 101.5 MHz

Programming
- Language: Spanish
- Format: Christian

Ownership
- Owner: Francisco Martinez, Rafael Pantoja, and James Merlo; (Calvario Communications, LLC)
- Sister stations: KWDW-LP

Technical information
- Licensing authority: FCC
- Facility ID: 191552
- Class: C3
- ERP: 14,000 watts
- HAAT: 88 meters (289 ft)
- Transmitter coordinates: 36°07′11.10″N 98°15′46.10″W

Links
- Public license information: Public file; LMS
- Website: salvacionradionetwork.org

KOCD (101.5 FM) is a radio station licensed to Okeene, Oklahoma, United States. The station is currently owned by Francisco Martinez, Rafael Pantoja, and James Merlo, through licensee Calvario Communications, LLC.

KOCD broadcasts a Spanish-language Christian format.

== History ==
This station was assigned call sign KOCD on September 5, 2013. The station was in November 2018 as Radio Network Salvación.
