= KPCG-LP =

- Edmond, Oklahoma; United States
- Broadcast area: Oklahoma City, Oklahoma
- Frequency: 101.3
- Branding: Trumpet Radio 101.3

Programming
- Format: Religious

Ownership
- Owner: Philadelphia Church of God, Inc.

Technical information
- Licensing authority: FCC
- Facility ID: 196287
- Class: LP1
- ERP: 40 watts
- HAAT: 46.8 meters (154 ft)
- Transmitter coordinates: 35°44′20″N 97°27′08″W

Links
- Public license information: LMS
- Website: kpcg.fm

KPCG-LP (101.3 FM) is a low-power FM radio station broadcasting a non-denominational Christian religious format. Licensed to Edmond, Oklahoma, United States, the station serves the Oklahoma City, Oklahoma area. The station is currently licensed to Philadelphia Church of God, Inc. and broadcasts from the campus of Herbert W. Armstrong College.

== History ==
The station was assigned call sign KPCG-LP on February 3, 2015.

This station is owned and operated by a church nearby, and thus regularly transmits Christian beliefs and songs.
