= KSSO =

Sonlife Radio station in Norman, Oklahoma

Norman, Oklahoma; United States
- Broadcast area: Oklahoma City, Oklahoma
- Frequency: 89.3 MHz
- Branding: Sonlife Radio

Programming
- Format: Gospel

Ownership
- Owner: Family Worship Center Church, Inc.

Technical information
- Licensing authority: FCC
- Facility ID: 77089
- Class: A
- ERP: 5,600 watts
- HAAT: 50 meters (160 ft)
- Transmitter coordinates: 35°13′22.00″N 97°26′21.00″W

Links
- Public license information: Public file; LMS
- Webcast: http://www.jsm.org/sonlife/SonlifeRadioHQ.m3u
- Website: http://sonlifetv.com/index.html

KSSO (89.3 FM, "Sonlife Radio") is a radio station broadcasting a gospel music format. Licensed to Norman, Oklahoma, United States, the station is currently owned by Family Worship Center Church, Inc.
