= KCYI-LP =

- Edmond, Oklahoma; United States
- Broadcast area: Oklahoma City, Oklahoma
- Frequency: 97.7 MHz
- Branding: 97.7 The City

Programming
- Format: Smooth Jazz

Ownership
- Owner: Edwards Broadcasting

History
- First air date: 2016
- Former call signs: KSQE-LP (2015–2018)

Technical information
- Licensing authority: FCC
- Facility ID: 195458
- Class: LP1
- ERP: 10 watts
- HAAT: 93 meters (305 ft)
- Transmitter coordinates: 35°39′56.60″N 97°27′36.10″W

Links
- Public license information: LMS
- Webcast: KCYI Stream
- Website: 977smoothjazzthecity.com

KCYI-LP (97.7 FM) is a low-power FM radio station licensed to Edmond, Oklahoma, United States. The station is currently owned by Edwards Broadcasting.

== History ==
The station was assigned the call sign KSQE-LP on February 20, 2015. The call sign was changed to KCYI-LP.
