= KSMJ-LP =

- Edmond, Oklahoma; United States
- Broadcast area: Oklahoma City, Oklahoma
- Frequency: 100.9 MHz
- Branding: Oklahoma Catholic Broadcasting

Programming
- Format: Catholic Religious

Ownership
- Owner: Oklahoma Fellowship Of Catholic Men

History
- First air date: 2016

Technical information
- Licensing authority: FCC
- Facility ID: 194312
- Class: LP1
- ERP: 22 watts
- HAAT: 63 meters (207 ft)
- Transmitter coordinates: 35°38′52″N 97°29′46″W

Links
- Public license information: LMS
- Website: http://www.okcr.org/

KSMJ-LP (100.9 FM) is a low-power FM radio station licensed to Edmond, Oklahoma, United States. The station is currently owned by Oklahoma Fellowship Of Catholic Men.

== History ==
The station call sign KSMJ-LP on February 21, 2014.
