= KTUZ (AM) =

Radio station in Catoosa, Oklahoma

- Catoosa, Oklahoma; United States
- Broadcast area: Tulsa, Oklahoma
- Frequency: 1570 kHz
- Branding: La Z 101.9FM

Programming
- Format: Regional Mexican

Ownership
- Owner: Tyler Media Group; (Tyler Media LLC)

History
- First air date: 1950
- Former call signs: KMYZ (1980–1984); KGCR (1984–1999); KMYZ (1999–2001); KMUR (2001–2007); KZLI (2007–2015)

Technical information
- Licensing authority: FCC
- Facility ID: 59978
- Class: D
- Power: 1,000 watts (day only)
- Transmitter coordinates: 36°15′52″N 95°42′34″W
- Translator: See § Translators

Links
- Public license information: Public file; LMS
- Webcast: Listen live
- Website: unidosok.com/tulsa/la-zeta/

KTUZ (1570 AM) is a radio station broadcasting a regional Mexican format. The station is licensed to Catoosa, Oklahoma, United States and serves the Tulsa metropolitan area. The station is owned by Tyler Media Group, through licensee Tyler Media LLC.

The station was assigned the call letters KTUZ by the Federal Communications Commission on October 5, 2015.

== Translators ==
Call sign	Frequency	City of license	FID	ERP (W)	HAAT	Class	FCC info
K270BK	(101.9 MHz) FM	Tulsa, Oklahoma	157239	250	167 m (548 ft)	D	LMS
K281CO	(104.1 MHz) FM	Tulsa, Oklahoma	142076	99	167 m (548 ft)	D	LMS
