= KOMA (FM) =

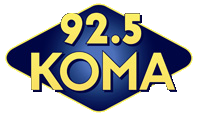
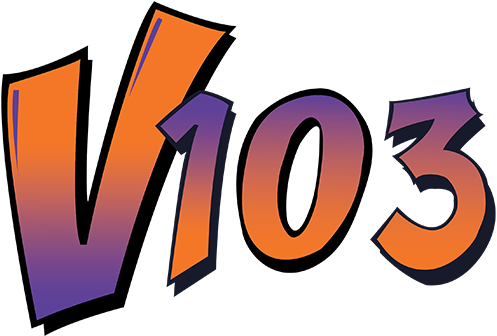
- Oklahoma City, Oklahoma; United States
- Broadcast area: Oklahoma City Metroplex
- Frequency: 92.5 MHz (HD Radio)
- Branding: 92.5 KOMA

Programming
- Language: English
- Format: Classic hits
- Subchannels: HD2: 92.9 The Edge (Alternative rock); HD3: V103 (Classic hip hop)

Ownership
- Owner: Tyler Media Group; (Tyler Media, L.L.C.)
- Sister stations: KEBC, KJKE, KMGL, KOKC, KRXO-FM, KTLR, KTUZ-FM

History
- Founded: April 29, 1964
- First air date: November 1964
- Former call signs: KTEA-FM (1964–1966); KXLS (1966–1972); KKNG (1972–1992)
- Call sign meaning: Oklahoma

Technical information
- Licensing authority: FCC
- Facility ID: 72469
- Class: C
- ERP: 94,000 watts (100,000 with beam tilt)
- HAAT: 472 meters (1,549 ft)
- Transmitter coordinates: 35°33′36″N 97°29′08″W
- Translators: HD2: 92.9 K225BN (Oklahoma City); HD3: 103.1 K276EX (Oklahoma City); HD3: 103.3 K277DD (Norman)

Links
- Public license information: Public file; LMS
- Webcast: Listen Live; Listen Live (HD2); Listen Live (HD3)
- Website: komaradio.com 929theedge.com (HD2) v103okc.com (HD3)

KOMA (92.5 MHz, "92.5 KOMA") is a classic hits formatted FM radio station serving the Oklahoma City area owned by Tyler Media, a locally based, family-owned company controlled by brothers Ty and Tony Tyler. The station's studios are located in Northeast Oklahoma City with a transmitter site located a mile east from the studio.

In addition to its standard analog transmission, KOMA broadcasts over three HD Radio channels. The HD2 digital subchannel airs an alternative rock format under the brand 92.9 The Edge, which is simulcast over analog translator K225BN (92.9 FM). The HD3 subchannel broadcasts a classic hip hop music format branded as V103, and is simulcast on analog translator K276EX (103.1 FM) and K277DD (103.3 FM).

== History ==
=== KTEA-FM ===
The history of 92.5 began when its initial construction permit was issued on April 29, 1964. The station bore the call letters KTEA-FM and was originally licensed to Midwest City. The station's studios and transmitter were originally co-located at 5926 Southeast 15th Drive in Midwest City. KTEA-FM was a standalone FM station originally owned by Midwest Stereo Broadcasting Company, a consortium of local investors. Initial investors included John Kennamer, Jr., John L. Kennamer, Sr., William D. Wilson, C.W. See, Lloyd Hines, and Melda V. Kennamer. KTEA-FM was originally set to sign on "on or about July 15", according to advertisements the station placed in the Daily Oklahoman. July 15 had come and gone, and the station had yet to sign on; it was now advertising that it would not sign on until "early August". The station did finally sign on in November; the delay was caused by the station not receiving its transmitter until October 17.

The station's original format included "county [sic] and western, classical and popular music," as Kennamer Jr. explained. KTEA-FM also carried broadcasts of the Boston Symphony Orchestra via stereo tape. Station officials stated that the station cost $50,000 to put on-air.

The station lasted about a year, as Midwest Stereo filed to transfer the station to the House of Sound Broadcasting Corporation on November 1, 1965. Midwest Stereo then took the station silent on January 19, 1966, as the new owners prepared to make major changes.

=== KXLS ===
House of Sound officially took control of 92.5 on February 20, 1966, and wasted no time getting to work. House of Sound filed to move the city of license from Midwest City to Oklahoma City proper, which took effect on May 11. The studios and transmitter were also moved into Oklahoma City. After making technical upgrades to the facility, 92.5 signed back on the air on September 15 with the new call letters KXLS.

The station broadcast an easy listening music format under The Young Sound branding. KXLS was owned by Robert Williams, the owner of House of Sound, a high-end sound store. The transmitter and studio combo were located at 108 Northeast 48th Street in Oklahoma City.

In February 1968, House of Sound sold KXLS to Dawson Communications, Inc., operating as Capitol Broadcasting, Inc. The sale was finalized July 3, 1968. The easy listening format remained in place.

=== KKNG ===
Dawson sold KXLS to Tulsa-based Swanco Broadcasting in January 1972, with the sale being finalized on February 2, 1972. That same day, Swanco changed the call letters to KKNG, airing a beautiful music format branded as KING Stereo 92. Marc Alan McLean, sales manager at Swanco's KQEO in Albuquerque, became KKNG's new general manager. Randy Anson, the program director of Swanco's WBYU in New Orleans, relocated to Oklahoma City to assume those same duties at KKNG. During its early years, KKNG aired traditional Christmas music uninterrupted for 36 hours from 12 pm Christmas Eve to 12 am December 26.

The transmitter moved to the northeast Oklahoma City antenna farm in 1976, teaming up with KAFG to build a new 1,000-foot tower at the intersection of Wilshire Boulevard and Kelley Avenue.

In March 1977, Swanco was reorganized into Swanson Broadcasting. Swanson sold KKNG and sister stations KRMG in Tulsa and KKYX-KLLS in San Antonio to New City Communications in a $20 million package deal that closed in early 1988. New City dic not retain KKNG for long, however. In January 1989, New City sold KKNG to Wilks-Schwartz Broadcasting for $3.5 million.

Under Wilks-Schwartz, KKNG moved away from its longtime easy listening format and evolved into a soft adult contemporary format under the branding Mix 92.5, which resulted in lower ratings.

In October 1991, KKNG evolved from soft AC into a more mainstream AC playlist to compete with market leader (and future sister station) KMGL, while retaining the Mix 92.5 branding. Jonathan Monk and Diana Kelly were brought in to host morning drive, while Brian Schiel joined from Topeka's KLZR for nights. The format tweak did not move the needle in the ratings and lasted only until the simulcast with KOMA began just a few months later.

=== KOMA moves to FM ===
The KOMA call letters and oldies format made the transition to 92.5 FM on June 22, 1992, after Chicago-based Diamond Broadcasting (then owner) entered a local marketing agreement with Wilks-Schwartz Broadcasting.

In May 1998, it was announced that KOMA and sister station, KRXO, were to be purchased by Renda Broadcasting. New digital studios in Northeast Oklahoma City were constructed. At 3 p.m. on November 9, 1998, KOMA began broadcasting from the new location. The studios, ironically, once housed KOMA's rival, WKY. Danny Williams, Ronnie Kaye and Fred Hendrickson all worked in the building during the 1970s when they were disc jockeys for WKY. After 37 years of broadcasting in Moore, KOMA's studios became vacant and remained unoccupied until 2016, when the building was razed.

KOMA (AM) continued its simulcast of its FM sister until February 2003, when it was decided that the 50,000-watt AM station would better serve the public as a news/talk outlet, now known as KOKC.

On July 15, 2012, Ty and Tony Tyler's Tyler Media entered into an agreement with Renda Broadcasting to purchase that company's Oklahoma City radio cluster (KMGL, KOMA, KRXO and KOKC) for $40 million. In accordance to limits imposed by the Federal Communications Commission on the number of radio stations a single broadcasting entity can own in a single market, Tyler sold KTLR and KKNG to WPA Radio for $1.6 million. Tyler's purchase of KOMA and its sister stations was consummated on November 13, 2012.

== HD Radio ==
KOMA transmits an HD Radio signal that allows them to transmit the main programming on their first digital subchannel, while second and third subchannels carry other programming for listeners with HD Radio-capable receivers. The programming is also relayed on analog translators for those without HD Radio-capable receivers.

=== KOMA-HD2 ===
K225BN, the analog translator that relays KOMA-HD2, originally signed on in 2013 as a simulcast of sister station KEBC and its programming. In November 2014, Tyler moved the CHR/Top 40 programming branded as Now 96.5 from KRXO-HD3 and analog translator K243BJ (96.5 MHz) to KOMA-HD2 and K225BN. The station changed its brand to Now 92.9 to reflect the new frequency. That format was designed to compete with heritage Top 40 station KJYO. On December 23, 2015, KOMA-HD2/K225BN flipped to alternative rock, branded as 92.9 The Edge. The programming originally was entirely automated with no on-air personalities, but DJs are now heard in the midday and afternoon drive shifts. K225BN broadcasts from a tower located in northeast Oklahoma City that is also used by other radio and television stations in the market.

Broadcast translator for KOMA-HD2
Call sign	Frequency	City of license	FID	ERP (W)	HAAT	Class	Transmitter coordinates	FCC info
K225BN	92.9 FM	Oklahoma City	139270	200	267.7 m (878 ft)	D	35°32′51″N 97°29′30″W	LMS

=== KOMA-HD3 ===
K276EX was originally an Oklahoma City-area translator for the Love Station's KJTH in Ponca City. While the Love Station is still the licensee for the translator, they began to lease it to Tyler Media in February 2014, which originally used it as an FM simulcast of KOKC. On June 4, 2015, the KOKC simulcast was replaced with the current classic hip-hop programming, branded as V103 with KOMA-HD3 now serving as the parent station. Core artists include Tupac, Missy Elliott, Jay-Z, Notorious B.I.G., Dr. Dre, Lauryn Hill, Snoop Dogg, Lil' Kim, and Usher, among others. KOMA-HD3 airs the syndicated DeDe in the Morning show weekday mornings, but is otherwise fully automated with no additional on-air personalities. K276EX broadcasts from a tower located in northeast Oklahoma City that is also used by other radio and television stations in the market.

Broadcast translators for KOMA-HD3
Call sign	Frequency	City of license	FID	ERP (W)	HAAT	Class	Transmitter coordinates	FCC info
K276EX	103.1 FM	Oklahoma City	145396	99	267.7 m (878 ft)	D	35°32′51″N 97°29′30″W	LMS
K277DD	103.3 FM	Norman, Oklahoma	153649	250	389 m (1,276 ft)	D	35°13′19″N 97°26′31″W	LMS

=== KOMA-HD4 ===
In July 2022, KOMA began simulcasting news radio station KOKC, branded as Newstalk 1520.
