= KMGL =

Adult contemporary radio station in Oklahoma City, Oklahoma

- Oklahoma City, Oklahoma; United States
- Broadcast area: Oklahoma City Metroplex
- Frequency: 104.1 MHz
- Branding: Magic 104.1

Programming
- Language: English
- Format: Adult contemporary
- Affiliations: Premiere Networks

Ownership
- Owner: Tyler Media Group; (Tyler Media, L.L.C.)
- Sister stations: KEBC, KJKE, KOKC, KOMA, KRXO-FM, KTLR, KTUZ-FM

History
- Founded: July 1, 1964 (initial CP issued)
- First air date: November 25, 1965
- Former call signs: KOFM (1965–1986)
- Call sign meaning: "Magic" (the station's branding)

Technical information
- Licensing authority: FCC
- Facility ID: 55708
- Class: C
- ERP: 92,000 watts
- HAAT: 472 meters (1,549 ft)
- Transmitter coordinates: 35°33′36″N 97°29′08″W

Links
- Public license information: Public file; LMS
- Webcast: Listen live
- Website: magic104.com

KMGL (104.1 FM, "Magic 104.1") is an adult contemporary music formatted radio station serving the Oklahoma City area and is owned by Tyler Media, a locally based, family-owned company controlled by brothers Ty and Tony Tyler. The station's studios are located in Northeast Oklahoma City with a transmitter site located a mile east from the studio.

KMGL is the radio partner of KWTV, which simulcasts News 9's severe weather coverage if a Tornado Warning is issued within the Oklahoma City metro area.

== History ==
=== KOFM ===
==== Early years ====
The station at 104.1 FM began life when an initial construction permit was issued on July 1, 1964, to BBC, Inc. (no relation to the British Broadcasting Corporation) was a consortium of local businessmen including Loyd Benefield, Jean Everest, and Leonard Savage. The station signed on for the first time on November 25, 1965, as KOFM with a beautiful music format described by station officials as a "balanced, modern sound". The transmitting antenna was originally located on the KOCO-TV tower, with a new studio building adjacent to the tower at 1200 East Britton Road. Former KOCO account executive Dean Ward was the station's inaugural general manager. Ward stated that the station cost $150,000 to construct. KOFM operated 24 hours a day with an effective radiated power of 100,000 watts, providing broad coverage of the entire market. During its early years, KOFM originated the Indian Nations News Network, which broadcast news updates every half-hour, six days per week, to 37 affiliates across Oklahoma.

In June 1974, BBC sold the station to Wichita-based American Radio Corporation (later American Media) for an undisclosed price. American was controlled by a trio of Wichita businessmen including Robert D. Freeman, Lowell D. Dennistron, and Frank L. Carney. The sale to American was approved by the FCC on September 26 of that year. The sale was completed on October 8.

==== Flip to album rock ====
During the early 1970s, KOFM adopted a unique format programmed by John Hendrix (formerly of KOCY FM) and Mike Elder (who would later become the VP of Programming for the Fox Talk Radio Network) called "Fresh Air." The format provided a unique progressive rock sound that included rock album cuts and special interrelated song sets, similar to KBCO in Boulder, Colorado. Later, under the ownership of American Media, KOFM flipped to Top 40/CHR programmed by Mike Miller, John Jenkins and Charlie Cooper, and used the positioning statement "Rockin' With The Hits".

On August 3, 1979, Portland, Maine-based Guy Gannett Communications announced that it would be buying KOFM from American for $3.8 million. The FCC approved the sale on March 26, 1980, and it was completed on March 31.

=== KMGL ===
Magic 104.1 KMGL logo used from 1990s to 2015.

On June 2, 1986, KOFM became KMGL "Magic 104", and changed formats to adult contemporary, airing programming from Transtar's "Format 41." The station originally intended to change its call letters to KOMJ, but legal action brought by Tulsa-based KQMJ led to the station opting for the now-current call letters instead. Over time, KMGL became a fully live AC-formatted station under the direction of program director and morning personality Steve O'Brien. KMGL has been one of Oklahoma City's top rated stations since the mid 1980s. Today, the KOFM call letters are now used by a station in Enid, Oklahoma.

In January 1988, Guy Gannett sold the station to Renda Broadcasting, marking the company's first expansion outside of its home market of Pittsburgh. The sale was approved by the FCC on March 11, and it was completed on April 7.

On July 15, 2012, Ty and Tony Tyler's Tyler Media entered into an agreement with Renda Broadcasting to purchase that company's Oklahoma City radio cluster (KMGL, KOMA, KRXO and KOKC) for $40 million. In accordance to limits imposed by the Federal Communications Commission on the number of radio stations a single broadcasting entity can own in a single market, Tyler sold KTLR and KKNG to WPA Radio for $1.6 million. Tyler's purchase of KMGL and its sister stations was consummated on November 13, 2012.

== Christmas Music ==
KMGL used to sprinkle Christmas music in regular rotation. However, at 12 p.m. on Christmas Eve, they would flip to all Christmas music, branding it the "Magic Of Christmas" and playing 36 hours of nonstop Christmas music. In 2004, KYIS flipped to all-Christmas music for the entire holiday season, and KMGL would only play all-Christmas music on weekends and go back to regular music during the week. In 2006, KMGL would flip to all-Christmas music the following Monday after KQOB started Christmas music the Friday before. Since then, KMGL flips to all-Christmas usually the week before Thanksgiving or the Friday after. In 2020 they started Christmas music on November 1. In 2021 Christmas music started November 5. KMGL generally experiences an increase in ratings during and following the holiday season. Oklahoma City's first radio station to do all-Christmas music was KWHP during the 1960s, followed by KQSR starting on the Wednesday before Thanksgiving.

== HD radio ==
KMGL, along with its sister FM stations in Oklahoma City including KOMA and KRXO-FM, broadcast on HD Radio for a short time from 2006 through 2008.

In 2005, Tony Renda Jr., the general manager of Renda Broadcasting said his company has signed a deal with iBiquity to convert all of the company's 24 stations in Pennsylvania, Florida, and Oklahoma to HD radio sometime in 2006.

In early 2008, Renda switched off their HD signals on all three of their stations in Oklahoma City including KOMA-FM, KMGL, and KRXO because of a few coverage holes — areas that received a poor signal — at least until the spring 2008 ratings period ended. "It's a temporary problem," Don Pollnow, Renda market manager said. "Our engineer is working on it with the manufacturer."

Renda also has turned off KRXO's HD signal during its University of Oklahoma football broadcasts.

HD requires a delay, generally of at least eight seconds, to allow the signal to be encoded and matched up with the regular analog signal.

University of Oklahoma fans with radios at the stadium had complained that the station's play-by-play was behind the actual game action.

Tyler would turn KRXO's HD signal back on a couple of months before they flipped it to Sports in Fall 2013 in order to move KRXO's Classic Rock format to its HD-2 subchannel. In Winter 2014, KOMA's HD signal was also reactivated. KMGL's HD signals still remain switched off due to the lack of personal interest or need to broadcast an HD subchannel.
