= KRXO-FM =

Radio station in Oklahoma City

- Oklahoma City, Oklahoma; United States
- Broadcast area: Oklahoma City Metroplex
- Frequency: 107.7 MHz (HD Radio)
- Branding: 107.7 The Franchise

Programming
- Languages: English; Spanish (HD3)
- Format: Sports
- Subchannels: HD2: Classic rock; HD3: Spanish CHR
- Affiliations: Vegas Stats & Information Network; Oklahoma Sooners

Ownership
- Owner: Tyler Media Group; (Tyler Media, L.L.C.)
- Sister stations: KEBC, KJKE, KMGL, KOKC, KOMA, KTLR, KTUZ-FM

History
- First air date: 1976
- Former call signs: KAEZ (1976–1985); KIMY (1985–1987); KRXO (1987–2015)
- Call sign meaning: "Rox Oklahoma" (previous rock format, now on HD2)

Technical information
- Licensing authority: FCC
- Facility ID: 16851
- Class: C
- ERP: 92,000 watts
- HAAT: 470 meters (1,540 ft)
- Transmitter coordinates: 35°33′37″N 97°29′07″W
- Translators: HD2: 104.5 K283BW (Oklahoma City); HD3: 96.5 K243BJ (Oklahoma City)

Links
- Public license information: Public file; LMS
- Webcast: Listen live Listen live (HD2); Listen Live (HD3)
- Website: thefranchiseok.com HD2: krxo.com HD3: KRXO-HD3 Online

KRXO-FM (107.7 MHz) is a commercial radio station in Oklahoma City, Oklahoma. It is owned by Ty and Tony Tyler's Tyler Media, L.L.C., and it carries a sports radio format. The studios are on East Britton Road the northeast side of Oklahoma City. KRXO-FM is one of two Tyler Media stations in Oklahoma City that air a sports format, the other being KEBC (which mostly carries the Vegas Stats & Information Network (VSiN) Radio Network). KRXO-FM has mostly Oklahoma-based sports shows with VSiN programming heard late nights and weekends.

KRXO-FM has an effective radiated power (ERP) of 92,000 watts. The transmitter is off Ridgeway Road in Northeast Oklahoma City, amid the towers for other FM and TV stations in the market. KRXO-FM broadcasts using HD Radio technology. The HD-2 digital subchannel carries a Classic Rock format and feeds FM translator K283BW at 104.5 MHz. The HD3 subchannel carries a Spanish adult hits format and feeds FM translator K243BJ at 96.5 MHz.

== History ==
=== Urban AC and Classic Rock ===
107.7 KRXO logo used from 1990s to 2013.

The station began broadcasting in 1976 with the call letters KAEZ. The call sign stood for "Eazy 107" and it played an Urban Adult Contemporary format that included a wide-ranging playlist of R&B, soul, jazz and blues. The station played very little hip hop or rap music in the early 1980s. KAEZ remained on the air until November 23, 1985, when the station sold to Price Communications and went silent.

On February 25, 1986, the station returned to air as KIMY, and flipped to adult contemporary music as "My 107.7". Then on August 7, 1987, it switched to classic rock as KRXO. The classic rock format stayed in place for 26 years.

=== Ownership changes ===
On July 15, 2012, Tyler Media entered into an agreement with Renda Broadcasting to purchase that company's Oklahoma City radio stations. That cluster was made up of KMGL, KOMA, KRXO and KOKC, and the price tag was $40 million.

In accordance to limits imposed by the Federal Communications Commission on the number of radio stations a single broadcasting entity can own in a single market, Tyler sold KTLR and KKNG to WPA Radio for $1.6 million. Tyler's purchase of KRXO and its sister stations was consummated on November 13, 2012.

=== Switch to Sports ===
On July 10, 2013, Tyler Media announced that the station would adopt an All-Sports format, and be known as "107.7 The Franchise" replacing the station's longtime Classic Rock format. That programming and format moved to KRXO-HD2, a digital subchannel which is also simulcast on translator K283BW at 104.5 MHz. The Franchise officially launched on August 22, 2013, at 2pm. The move was made due to declining ratings for the classic rock format as well as to protect sister station KOMA (whose playlist overlapped with KRXO's). Programming includes University of Oklahoma Sooners football and basketball, as well as NFL games on Sunday, Monday and Thursday nights.

On September 16, 2015, Tyler Media filed to change the call sign to "KRXO-FM" and move the "KRXO" call sign to a co-owned sports station in Tulsa. The call sign change to KRXO-FM occurred on September 23, 2015. The Tulsa station shared some Oklahoma-based sports programming with KRXO-FM until it flipped to a Spanish language format in 2020.

== HD Radio ==
KRXO-FM transmits an HD Radio signal. That allows them to transmit the main programming on their first digital subchannel, while second and third subchannels carry other programming for listeners with HD Radio-capable receivers. The programming is also relayed on analog translators for those without HD Radio-capable receivers.

In 2005, Tony Renda Jr., the general manager of Renda Broadcasting, said his company had signed a deal with iBiquity to start offering HD Radio on the company's 24 stations in Pennsylvania, Florida, and Oklahoma in 2006.

University of Oklahoma sports fans with radios at the stadium had complained that the station's play-by-play was behind the actual game action. As a result, KRXO's HD Radio digital signal is often disabled during its University of Oklahoma football broadcasts.

=== KRXO-FM-HD2 ===
104.5's life began in August 2013 when it started to simulcast KRXO and its outgoing classic rock format. When KRXO's main analog signal flipped to its current sports format, K283BW and KRXO-HD2 continued to carry the classic rock programming that had been discarded from 107.7. KRXO-FM-HD2 is branded as 104.5 KRXO after the translator's frequency. K283BW broadcasts from a tower located in Northeast Oklahoma City that is also used by other radio and television stations in the market. KRXO-FM-HD2 features air personalities who are also heard on other stations in the Tyler Media cluster.

Broadcast translator for KRXO-HD2
Call sign	Frequency	City of license	FID	ERP (W)	HAAT	Class	Transmitter coordinates	FCC info
K283BW	104.5 FM	Oklahoma City	145901	250	301.7 m (990 ft)	D	35°32′51″N 97°29′31″W	LMS

=== KRXO-FM-HD3 ===
KRXO-FM-HD3 originates a Spanish CHR format branded as "Ritmo 96.5". The programming is repeated on analog translator K243BJ at 96.5 MHz for those without HD Radios. K243BJ broadcasts from a tower located at Tyler Media's headquarters and Spanish-language broadcast complex (5101 South Shields Drive in South Oklahoma City). The studios for KRXO-FM-HD3 are located there as well (separately from its English-language sister stations).

Previous KRXO-FM HD3 logo

Originally a relay for KEBC, K243BJ/KRXO-FM-HD3 flipped to Top 40/CHR as "Now 96.5" on September 12, 2013. In November 2014, "Now" was moved to K225BN/KOMA-HD2 and rebranded as "Now 92.9"; after the move, K243BJ/KRXO-FM-HD3 flipped to a Spanish oldies format. On May 1, 2025, K243BJ/KRXO-FM-HD3 changed their format from Spanish oldies to Spanish CHR, branded as "Ritmo 96.5".

Broadcast translator for KRXO-HD3
Call sign	Frequency	City of license	FID	ERP (W)	HAAT	Class	Transmitter coordinates	FCC info
K243BJ	96.5 FM	Oklahoma City	139283	250	184 m (604 ft)	D	35°24′54″N 97°30′33″W	LMS

== Notable people ==
=== Current ===
- Kelly Gregg, former Oklahoma Sooners football player and the Baltimore Ravens and Kansas City Chiefs

=== Former ===
- Tony Casillas, former Oklahoma Sooners football player, NFL veteran, member of the College Football Hall of Fame
- Dave Garrett, former New Orleans Saints and Dallas Cowboys play-by-play radio voice
