= KWDW-LP =

Oklahoma City, Oklahoma; United States
- Broadcast area: Oklahoma City, Oklahoma
- Frequency: 93.9 MHz
- Branding: Salvacion Radio

Programming
- Format: Spanish language Religious

Ownership
- Owner: Jesucristo Es Mi Fortaleza Church Inc

History
- First air date: August 2014

Technical information
- Licensing authority: FCC
- Facility ID: 192981
- Class: LP1
- ERP: 100 watts
- HAAT: 30 meters (98 ft)
- Transmitter coordinates: 35°21′39.80″N 97°34′54.90″W

Links
- Public license information: LMS
- Webcast: Listen Live
- Website: salvacionradionetwork.org

KWDW-LP (93.9 FM) is a low-power FM radio station licensed to Oklahoma City, Oklahoma, United States. The station is currently owned by Jesuristo Es Mi Fortaleza Church Inc.

== History ==
The callsign was KWDW-LP on April 3, 2014.
