= KOKC (AM) =

Clear-channel radio station in Oklahoma City

- Oklahoma City, Oklahoma; United States
- Broadcast area: Oklahoma City metropolitan area
- Frequency: 1520 kHz
- Branding: Talk Radio's New Generation

Programming
- Language: English
- Format: Talk radio
- Affiliations: 24/7 News; Compass Media Networks; Fox News Radio; KOCO; Radio America; Westwood One

Ownership
- Owner: Tyler Media Group; (Tyler Media, L.L.C.)
- Sister stations: KEBC; KJKE; KMGL; KOMA; KRXO-FM; KTLR; KTUZ-FM

History
- First air date: July 1923
- Former call signs: KFJF (1923–1932); KOMA (1932–2004)
- Call sign meaning: Oklahoma City

Technical information
- Licensing authority: FCC
- Facility ID: 73981
- Class: A
- Power: 50,000 watts
- Transmitter coordinates: 35°20′00″N 97°30′16″W
- Translator: 95.3 K237GE (Oklahoma City)
- Repeater: 92.5 KOMA-HD4 (Oklahoma City)

Links
- Public license information: Public file; LMS
- Webcast: Listen live
- Website: kokcradio.com

KOKC (1520 kHz) is a commercial AM radio station in Oklahoma City, Oklahoma. It is locally owned by the Tyler Media Group and airs a talk radio format. The studios and offices are located on East Britton Road in Northeast Oklahoma City. It is central Oklahoma's primary entry point station for the Emergency Alert System.

The transmitter site is off Southwest 4th Street in Moore, Oklahoma. KOKC is a Class A clear channel station, broadcasting at the maximum U.S. AM station power of 50,000 watts. By day, the signal is non-directional. But at night, to protect WWKB Buffalo, New York, the other Class A station on AM 1520, KOKC must use a directional antenna. With a good radio, KOKC can be heard across much of the Great Plains and Rocky Mountain states at night.

KOKC is also heard on a 250-watt FM translator K237GE at 95.3 MHz, which covers Oklahoma City and adjacent communities. KOKC programming can also be heard on sister station 92.5 KOMA-FM's HD4 digital subchannel.

== Programming ==
KOKC's weekday schedule is mostly nationally syndicated conservative talk programs. Including America in the Morning, Chris Plante, Chad Benson, Markely, Van Camp and Robbins, Guy Benson, America At Night, and Red Eye Radio heard overnight.

On weekends, KOKC features shows on gardening, money, health, technology, the outdoors and pets. Syndicated shows on weekends include Kim Komando and Brian Kilmeade, as well as repeats of weekday shows. Weather forecasts are from the KOCO 5 First Alert Weather team. Most hours on KOKC begin with world and national news from iHeartMedia's 24/7 News.

== History ==
=== Early years ===
The station's first license, with the sequentially assigned call letters of KFJF, was issued in July 1923. The station was owned by the National Radio Manufacturing Company in Oklahoma City, using a transmitter power of 20 watts on 1190 kHz. The station made its first broadcasts in early July. In early August, station founder Dudley Shaw and partner George H. Gabus announced that KFJF had begun a regular daily schedule of news and music each afternoon at 3:00.

In late 1924, KFJF was licensed for 225 watts on 1150 kHz, with the station claiming to have over 100,000 listeners. Power was increased to 500 watts in late 1925. In June 1927, its frequency was changed to 1100 kHz. On November 11, 1928, as a result of the FRC's General Order 40, KFJF changed to 1470 kHz, a "high power regional" frequency, and raised its power to 5,000 watts. In early 1930, KFJF, along with WKBW in Buffalo, New York, was reassigned to 1480 kHz, another "high power regional" frequency.

=== KOMA ===
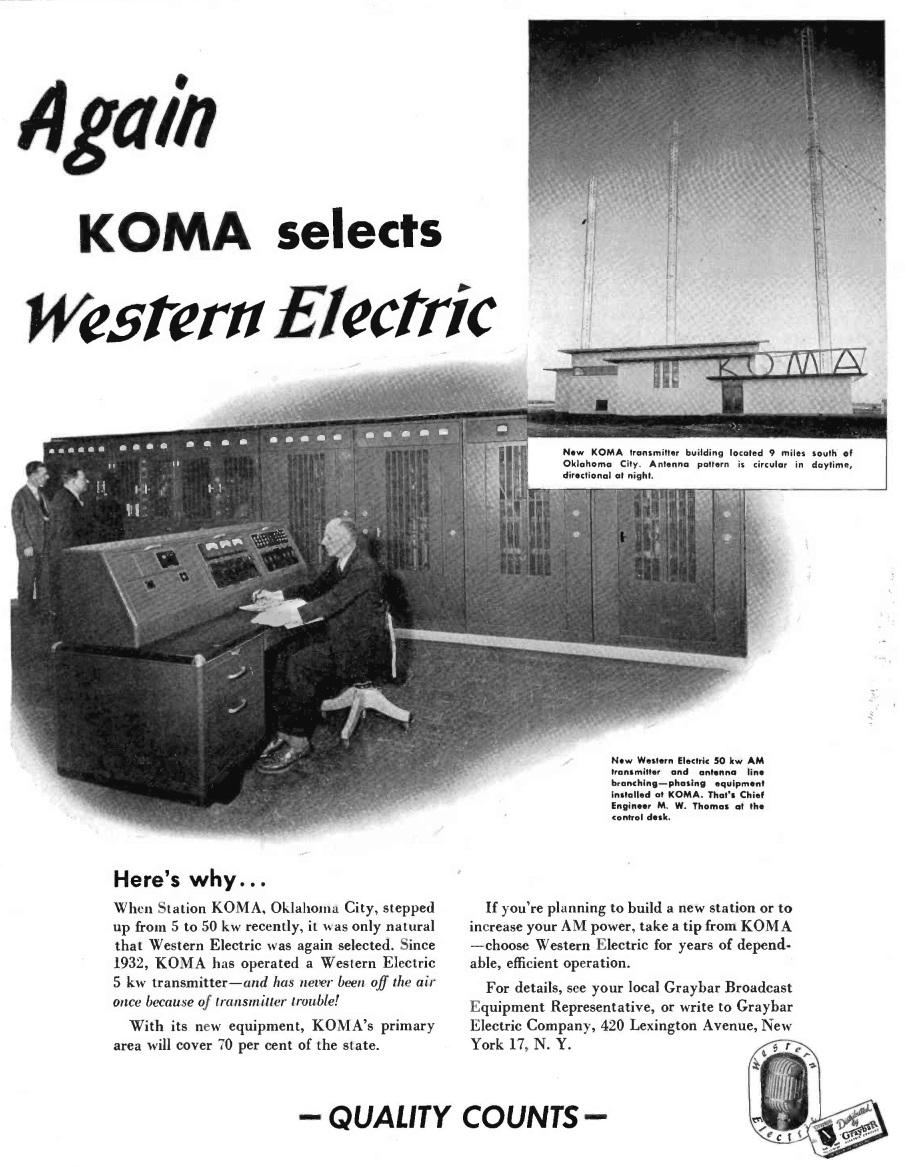
KOMA upgraded from 5,000 to 50,000 watts in early 1947.

In 1932, the station changed its call letters to KOMA, and moved its studios to the Biltmore Hotel in downtown Oklahoma City. The station was purchased in 1938 by J.T. Griffin, who also owned the Griffin Grocery Company, which made condiments and baking products for distribution around the region.

In March 1941, KOMA shifted to its current "clear channel" frequency of 1520 kHz as a result of the North American Regional Broadcasting Agreement, with the provision that it and WKBW in Buffalo, as "Class I-B" stations, had to maintain directional antennas at night in order to mutually protect each other from interference.

KOMA became an affiliate of the CBS Radio Network. It carried the CBS line up of dramas, comedies, news, sports, soap operas, game shows and big band broadcasts during the "Golden Age of Radio". KOMA began operating at 50,000 watts in early 1947. A new transmitter site was constructed around the northeast corner of Kelly and Britton where the present-day Oklahoma Centennial High School sits. KOMA-FM was granted a license on 105.9 MHz and went on the air in the 1948. It mostly simulcast the AM station, but management didn't see much future in FM broadcasting and gave up the station by the late 1950s.

J.T. Griffin, along with Griffin's son John and his brother-in-law, were all involved in securing a construction permit from the Federal Communications Commission to start a television station. KWTV on channel 9 went on the air December 20, 1953, initially broadcasting from a shorter temporary tower on the studio grounds while the permanent tower was under construction. The new tower was at one time the tallest in the world, at 1,572 feet (479 meters). The call sign KWTV was chosen, instead of KOMA-TV, standing for World's Tallest Video.

=== Top 40 years ===
By the late 1950s, network programming was moving from radio to television. In May 1958, KOMA ended its long-time affiliation with CBS to become "an independent", with a brief affiliation with NBC Radio. KOMA management decided to turn from serving adults to focusing on the growing youth market. The station became the third in Oklahoma City to flip to a Top 40 format, behind KOCY and WKY.

Todd Storz, one of the early pioneers in Top 40 radio, purchased KOMA in 1958. He added it to his list of hit radio stations, including WHB in Kansas City, KXOK in St. Louis, WTIX in New Orleans, WDGY in Minneapolis, and WQAM in Miami.

Prior to the sale to Storz, a preliminary agreement was reached with Gordon McLendon in February 1958 to purchase the station. Had the McLendon sale been approved, KOMA would have been co-owned with KLIF in Dallas and KILT in Houston. McLendon is widely credited for perfecting, during the 1950s and 1960s, the commercially successful Top 40 radio format created by Storz.

In 1961, KOMA became an automated station, but by 1964, returned to "live" programming.

=== Competition with WKY ===
Even with its 50,000-watt signal, KOMA faced a serious challenge during the 1960s and 1970s from cross-town competitor WKY.

Many times, WKY led the ratings in the Oklahoma City metro area, while KOMA was much better known outside the market, due to its greater nighttime skywave coverage. In 1974, Billboard named KOMA the medium-market "station of the year" and program director J. Robert Dark was named Billboard's medium-market Program Director of the year.

With little adjacent channel interference, KOMA had a tremendous reach with its 50,000-watt signal. In many areas of the Plains states and the West, KOMA was the only Top 40 station serving some rural areas and small towns. At night, KOMA could be picked up in such far away locales as Denver, Salt Lake City, Albuquerque, and Phoenix. Concert promoters advertised their up-and-coming acts (e.g. "Spider and the Crabs") appearing at various towns' National Guard armories, etc., on KOMA. Sometimes, these were some of the only ads aired during nighttime hours on KOMA, as Oklahoma City advertisers got better results from local OKC stations such as WKY.

=== Country, adult standards, oldies ===
KOMA's Top 40 era officially ended on September 12, 1980, when the station flipped to country music, and "KOMA Country" was born. The first song played was John Denver's "Thank God I'm a Country Boy". KOMA would remain in the Storz family until July 1, 1984, when it was purchased by Price Communications. By the 1980s, many country music listeners were shifting from AM to FM stations.

Price Communications kept KOMA's country format in place until September 1985, when it was determined that FM competition was too much to overcome. KOMA adopted the slogan "Forty Years of Favorites," and specialized in an adult standards format. In January 1986, the station began broadcasting in AM stereo using the C-QUAM system.

On September 1, 1988, Chicago-based Diamond Broadcasting, Inc. purchased KOMA along with sister station KRXO. On September 22, KOMA returned to its glory days by switching to an oldies format, bringing back the hits of the 1950s and 1960s to a familiar spot on the dial for those who grew up listening to the station.

The KOMA call letters made the transition to 92.5 FM on June 22, 1992, after Diamond Broadcasting entered a local marketing agreement (LMA) with Wilks Schwartz Broadcasting, which owned that FM station. It was the first agreement of its kind in the Oklahoma City area; listeners now could hear their favorite oldies on either the AM or FM station.

=== Ownership changes ===
In May 1998, KOMA and KRXO were announced as being purchased by Renda Broadcasting. New state-of-the-art digital studios in northeast Oklahoma City were constructed for the arrival of the legendary station. At 3:00 pm on November 9, 1998, KOMA began broadcasting from the new location. The studios, ironically, once housed KOMA's rival, WKY. Danny Williams, Ronnie Kaye, and Fred Hendrickson all worked in the building during the 1970s when they were disc jockeys for WKY.

After 37 years of broadcasting in Moore, KOMA's studios became vacant and remained unoccupied until 2016, when the building was razed. KOKC's tower and transmitter facility remained at the former site.

On July 15, 2012, Ty and Tony Tyler's "Tyler Media" entered into an agreement with Renda Broadcasting to purchase that company's Oklahoma City radio cluster (KMGL, KOMA, KRXO, and KOKC) for $40 million. In accordance with limits imposed by the Federal Communications Commission on the number of radio stations a single broadcasting entity can own in a single market, Tyler sold KTLR and KKNG to WPA Radio for $1.6 million. Tyler's purchase of KOKC and its sister stations was consummated on November 13, 2012.

=== Switch to talk and call letter change to KOKC ===
In 2002, the station added The Radio Factor with Fox News Channel star Bill O'Reilly, as well as CBS Radio News at the top of the hour, fueling speculation about a move to a talk format. Later that year, KOMA's then-parent company, Renda Broadcasting, announced it was discontinuing the simulcast with KOMA-FM. The oldies format would remain on the FM station, while the AM station would switch to all-talk.

The launch date for the talk format was originally set for Monday, February 3, 2003, but the disintegration of Space Shuttle Columbia on re-entry prompted the change two days earlier.

Former logo

To distinguish the station from the oldies programming on KOMA-FM, KOMA changed its call letters to KOKC on August 27, 2004. The call letters had previously been used since the 1950s at KOKC 1490, a station based in Guthrie, Oklahoma. In 2004, KOKC switched its news network to ABC a short time later.

In February 2011, KOKC dropped its network affiliation with ABC, returning to CBS. During the 1930s and 1940s, CBS provided the station over 90% of its programming. The station had been affiliated with the network on several occasions, most recently when KOKC (then KOMA) flipped to a news-talk format in 2003.

In September 2017, KOKC dropped CBS News once again, and changed network affiliation to Westwood One News. KOKC returned to CBS on August 30, 2020, after Westwood One News ended operations. For the final time, KOKC ended its long-time affiliation with CBS on May 22, 2026, due to the network shutting down after 98 years of broadcasting. Subsequently, KOKC switched to iHeartMedia's 24/7 News.

=== OU Sooners ===
For more than 20 years, KOKC was the flagship station of University of Oklahoma sports, covering Oklahoma Sooners football, men's and women's basketball, and baseball. Much of that programming has been shifted to KOKC's all-sports sister station, KRXO-FM.

=== March 2015 tornado ===
On March 25, 2015, two of the station's three towers were destroyed and one other was heavily damaged when a tornado ripped through Moore, Oklahoma. KOKC's programming was temporarily moved to sister station KEBC. KOKC engineers were able to use the remaining standing but damaged tower to transmit the signal at reduced power. In February, 2022, KOKC applied to the FCC to redesign its three-tower directional array and return to broadcasting at 50,000 watts full time. On April 22, 2022, KOKC was granted the construction permit for the redesign by the FCC. On January 19, 2024, KOKC was granted a license to cover for the rebuilt three-tower 50 kW nighttime array, and now KOKC can once again cover much of the western US with its skywave signal.

== Notable alumni ==
- Paul Harvey (1918–2009) – The Rest of the Story
- Curt Gowdy (1919–2006) was hired in 1946 by KOMA for play-by-play coverage of OU Sooner football, as well as Oklahoma State (then Oklahoma A&M) basketball games. His distinctive style during his broadcasts in Oklahoma City earned him a national audition and then an opportunity with the New York Yankees in 1949.
- Rod Roddy (1937–2003) – announcer, The Price Is Right (1985–2003)
- Charlie Tuna (1944–2016) later worked at several Los Angeles stations, including 93/KHJ and KRTH-FM 101.1.
- M.G. Kelly – actor/syndicated DJ
- John Peel a.k.a. John Ravenscroft (1939–2004) – KOMA's "Beatle Expert" from 1964 to 1966, he later was a respected disc jockey, radio presenter, and journalist in the U.K.
- Danny Williams (1927–2013) was program director of 1520 KOMA's Top-40 rival, WKY. He began his legendary career in Oklahoma City in 1950 and would stay at WKY until his first "retirement" in 1979. He returned to the airwaves in June, 1992, on KOMA AM-FM. At the age of 81, he retired from 92.5 KOMA on August 29, 2008, after spending the last 16 years as the morning drive personality.
- Ronnie Kaye was heard on KOMA-AM from 1992 to 2003, as the station was simulcast on KOMA-FM. He remained with KOMA as midday personality until October 2023.
- Ernest Istook, a former Republican member of the United States House of Representatives for the 5th District of Oklahoma, was a member of the Appropriations and the Homeland Security committees. He was the Republican gubernatorial nominee in 2006, running against incumbent Democrat Gov. Brad Henry. Istook lost the gubernatorial race. During the 1970s, Istook worked as a radio news reporter at KOMA.

== Translator ==
Call sign	Frequency	City of license	FID	ERP (W)	HAAT	Class	FCC info
K237GE	(95.3 MHz) FM	Oklahoma City, Oklahoma	143059	250	302 m (991 ft)	D	LMS
