= KKNG-FM =

- Blanchard, Oklahoma; United States
- Broadcast area: Oklahoma City Metroplex
- Frequency: 97.3 MHz
- Branding: Oklahoma Catholic Radio

Programming
- Format: Catholic Religious
- Affiliations: EWTN Radio Network

Ownership
- Owner: Mark Whitten; (KKNG Radio LLC)

History
- First air date: August 18, 1977
- Former call signs: KWEY-FM (1977–1984); KBXR (1984–1991); KWEY-FM (1991–2006); KOJK (2006–2010)
- Call sign meaning: Previous format of "King Country"

Technical information
- Licensing authority: FCC
- Facility ID: 73947
- Class: A
- ERP: 1,000 watts
- HAAT: 244 meters (801 ft)
- Transmitter coordinates: 35°10′38″N 97°36′10″W

Links
- Public license information: Public file; LMS
- Webcast: Listen Live
- Website: okcr.org

KKNG-FM (97.3 FM) is a radio station licensed to Blanchard, Oklahoma, serving the Oklahoma City Metroplex. It is owned by Mark Whitten, through licensee KKNG Radio LLC.

KKNG-FM carries a religious talk and information radio format focusing on Catholic listeners, and airs programming from the EWTN Radio Network. The transmitter is at NE 40th Street at U.S. Route 62 in Blanchard.

== History ==
On August 18, 1977, the station first signed on as KWEY-FM. It was originally licensed to Weatherford, Oklahoma. In March 1984, the station became KBXR.

It changed back to KWEY-FM on September 20, 1991. Until 2006, it was a country station branded "97.3 The Coyote". In 2006, the transmitter was moved closer to Oklahoma City and its format changed to variety hits. It became KOJK, and joined the Jack FM network as "97.3 Jack FM." It used the national programming feed for Jack stations in smaller markets.

On March 8, 2010, after playing "I'll Cry Instead" by The Beatles, KOJK flipped to country as "97.3 King Country." The call sign was later changed to KKNG-FM a week later to match the branding. (KKNG was previously used by a popular country station at 93.3 MHz, now KJKE.) KKNG's DJ's included Lynn Waggoner in the morning, Vanessa Valli midday, Owen Pickard for "The Afternoon Drive", and Carly Rae on the night shift. Waggoner also hosted The Sunday Morning Gospel Show, featuring Southern Gospel music.

On February 28, 2013, at 10 p.m., after playing "You're the Only One" by Dolly Parton, KKNG joined the statewide Oklahoma Catholic Radio network and took over the OKC simulcast from AM 890 KTLR, which had previously aired it part-time.
