= KTUZ-FM =

Radio station in Okarche, Oklahoma

- Okarche, Oklahoma; United States
- Broadcast area: Oklahoma City metropolitan area
- Frequency: 106.7 MHz
- Branding: La "Z" 106.7

Programming
- Format: Regional Mexican

Ownership
- Owner: Tyler Media Group
- Sister stations: KOMA, KMGL, KRXO-FM, KOKC, KJKE, KEBC

History
- First air date: 1980 as KWOE-FM (106.9 FM Clinton, OK)

Technical information
- Licensing authority: FCC
- Facility ID: 14762
- Class: C2
- ERP: 13,000 watts
- HAAT: 292 meters (958 ft)
- Transmitter coordinates: 35°36′49″N 97°52′21″W

Links
- Public license information: Public file; LMS
- Webcast: Listen Live
- Website: ktuz.com

KTUZ-FM (106.7 FM, "La Z") is a Regional Mexican radio station serving the Oklahoma City Metroplex area and is owned by Tyler Media Group. Tyler Media also owns KTUZ-TV (channel 30), for which the television station was given the radio station's callsign. The station's studios are located in Northeast Oklahoma City and a transmitter site is located in unincorporated Canadian County.

== History ==
The station began broadcasting in 1968 as KWOE-FM and adopted a country format. It changed calls in 1981 to KKCC-FM and again in June 1990 to KSWR. The station flipped to an oldies format in September 1996 and changed its call letters to KCLI-FM. In late 2000, it moved to Okarche, Oklahoma, in order to serve the Oklahoma City market and adopted the call letters KTUZ-FM. During this time changed to a Regional Mexican format. On May 30, 2018, KTUZ-FM Tower collapsed after a crop duster struck the tower and killing the pilot on board the aircraft. Tyler Media has plans to get KTUZ-FM back on for an auxiliary site while the NTSB and the FAA investigate the plane crash.
