= KEBC =

- Del City, Oklahoma; United States
- Broadcast area: Oklahoma City Metroplex
- Frequency: 1560 kHz
- Branding: The Franchise 2

Programming
- Format: Sports
- Affiliations: Vegas Stats & Information Network

Ownership
- Owner: Ty & Tony Tyler; (Tyler Media LLC)
- Sister stations: KJKE, KMGL, KOKC, KOMA, KRXO-FM, KTLR, KTUZ-FM

History
- First air date: November 1946 (as KWCO)
- Former call signs: KWCO (1946–2003); KOCY (2003–2010)

Technical information
- Licensing authority: FCC
- Facility ID: 6747
- Class: B
- Power: 1,000 watts day 250 watts night
- Transmitter coordinates: 35°26′27″N 97°29′24″W

Links
- Public license information: Public file; LMS
- Webcast: Listen Live
- Website: thefranchisok.com/shows/franchise-2

KEBC (1560 AM) is a commercial radio station licensed to Del City, Oklahoma, and serving the Oklahoma City Metroplex. It is owned by the Tyler Media Group and airs a sports format. The station's studios are on East Britton Road in Northeast Oklahoma City. Tyler Media owns two sports stations in Oklahoma City. Most programming on KEBC comes from the Vegas Stats & Information Network, while 107.7 KRXO-FM has mostly Oklahoma-based sports shows.

By day, KEBC is powered at 1,000 watts. But because 1560 AM is a clear channel frequency, KEBC must use a directional antenna and reduce power at night to 250 watts to avoid interference. The transmitter site is off SE 25th Street near Interstate 35.

== History ==
the KEBC call sign was originally on 94.7FM. It originally stood for The Electronic Broadcast Company, established by Gene Wingate and Ronnie Tutor but utilized the slogan "Keep Every Body Country" and was the first top FM country station in Oklahoma City. The station was eventually sold and operated by Ralph Tyler.

For a number of years the call sign was warehoused on 1340 AM (by CC to keep it away from the Tylers) ironically on the former KOCY radio, which for years was owned by Matt Bonebrake, was one of the first rock-and-roll stations in the OKC metro area back in the latter part of the 50s. The studios for KOCY back then were located at the Plaza Court Building at 10th and Classen. Dale Wheba, among others were jocks there. KOCY was one of the first 24-hour stations in the country at the time. It was rumored that Bonebrake made a million dollars a year for several years during KOCY's top-40 rock and roll days. When KOMA and then WKY dumped the network stuff and switched to rock and roll KOCY went "Modern Music" which is basically an MOR adult music format of the day. Studios for KOCY were eventually moved to 28th and Oklahoma, where 1340 currently still has transmitter facilities sporting the call of KEBC. After the station moved to 28th and Oklahoma, and switched to the Middle of the Road format, it went off the air at midnight.

Then in 1969, Matthew Bonebrake decided to once again go twenty-four hours. The first all-night disc jockey was legendary radio personality Vin Smith (then known as Mel Smith), who later gained fame as The Midnight Bookworm on CRN Digital Talk. Smith later moved the Midnight Bookworm book show to America First Radio, where it is a part of the Night Shift program, starring Uncle Buck, and the International UFO Institute Radio Program, where he co-hosts with Col. Ripster. Other fine broadcasters at KOCY were Al Cohen, who had a morning show on KOCY in the late 60s, and sportscasters Ross Porter, of Los Angeles Dodgers broadcasting fame, and NBC's all-time great, Curt Gowdy. Porter hosted sports reports. One of the great voices of radio, former Mutual Broadcasting mainstay Carlton Beck also worked at KOCY, late in his career. Beck was a close personal friend of owner Matthew Bonebrake, and had a wildly popular music program that ended at midnight (another recycled OKC call from the past).

In 2003, the KOCY callsign was selected by Tyler for their new 1560 AM station (the former KWCO (AM), Chickasha) that was moved into the Oklahoma City market, licensed to Del City. From the beginning of 1560's existence as a "DEL CITY" station it was affiliated with the Radio Disney network on August 1, 2003, until March 2013, when it flipped to 24/7 Comedy.

As a stroke of Oklahoma radio irony, Clear Channel gave up the KEBC call sign for its 1340 (AM) station in October 2010, in favor of KGHM (The Game). to coincide with that stations resent format change to sports a few years earlier. Very quickly afterward the Tyler group changed 1560's call sign to KEBC, as a result the Tyler family once again owns the KEBC call sign since family patriarch and Tyler group company founder Ralph Tyler used it for his 94.7(FM) station in the mid 70's to early 80's. The KOCY callsign was originally of course on 1340.

In March 2013, KEBC switched to a comedy format, and a translator application was filed with the FCC to bring KEBC's programming to FM.

Former logo under the NBC Sports Radio affiliation

On August 1, 2014, the station flipped to sports talk as The Franchise 2, branding itself as a sister station KRXO, known as "The Franchise". The station joined SportsMap Radio Network with the change. On November 1, 2014, the translator now is sold to KRXO.

On March 25, 2015, the three radio towers of sister station KOKC were partially if not completely destroyed when a tornado passed through Moore, Oklahoma. KOKC was off air while the towers are repaired or replaced, however KOKC'S programming was temporally transmitted on KEBC broadcast signal.
