= KJKE =

Radio station in Newcastle–Oklahoma City, Oklahoma

- Newcastle, Oklahoma; United States
- Broadcast area: Oklahoma City Metroplex
- Frequency: 93.3 MHz
- Branding: 93.3 Jake FM

Programming
- Language: English
- Format: New Country

Ownership
- Owner: Tyler Media; (Tyler Media, L.L.C.)
- Sister stations: KOMA, KMGL, KRXO-FM, KOKC, KTUZ, KEBC

History
- First air date: April 12, 1971
- Former call signs: KTEN-FM (1971–1984); KTLS (1984–1997); KKNG-FM (1997–2010)
- Call sign meaning: "Jake"

Technical information
- Licensing authority: FCC
- Facility ID: 50168
- Class: C1
- ERP: 100,000 watts
- HAAT: 243 meters (797 ft)
- Transmitter coordinates: 35°11′28″N 97°35′49″W

Links
- Public license information: Public file; LMS
- Webcast: Listen live
- Website: jakefm.com

KJKE (93.3 FM, "93.3 Jake FM") is a radio station broadcasting a new country music format. Licensed to Newcastle, Oklahoma, the station serves the Oklahoma City metropolitan area. The station is owned by Tyler Media. The station's studios are located in Northeast Oklahoma City and a transmitter site is located in Newcastle.

== History ==
KTEN-FM began broadcasting in Ada, Oklahoma, on April 12, 1971. The station became KTLS in 1984 and was acquired by the Post-Newsweek Cable division of The Washington Post Company in 1990 as part of a package deal with Ada's cable system.

Tyler Media acquired the then-adult contemporary outlet in 1995. Tyler moved the station into the Oklahoma City market and relaunched it as KKNG-FM, "King Country", in late 1997.

On March 14, 2010, the station debuted its present branding, "93.3 Jake FM". The call letters were also changed to the current KJKE to reflect the new brand.

In August 2023, it was announced Owen Pickard would return to KJKE as the music director and morning show co-host after his departure three years previously.

In June 2024, KJKE launched a new show called "Jake's Backroad Beats," hosted by former morning show co-host Carly Rae, airing Sunday nights from 6:00pm–8:00pm.
