= KINB =

Radio station in Kingfisher, Oklahoma

Coordinates: 35.727°N 97.875°W

- Kingfisher, Oklahoma; United States
- Broadcast area: Oklahoma City metropolitan area
- Frequency: 105.3 MHz (HD Radio)
- Branding: Sports Radio 105.3

Programming
- Format: Sports
- Subchannels: HD2: Smooth Jazz Smooth Jazz Network; HD3: Same as HD1
- Affiliations: Infinity Sports Network; Kansas City Chiefs; Oklahoma City Blue

Ownership
- Owner: Perry Publishing and Broadcasting; (Perry Media Group, LLC)
- Sister stations: KRMP, KVSP

History
- First air date: July 6, 2000 (as KLGH)
- Former call signs: KLGH (2000–2002); WWLS-FM (2002–2003); KSYY (2003–2004)
- Call sign meaning: Station was known as La Indomable

Technical information
- Licensing authority: FCC
- Facility ID: 88376
- Class: A
- ERP: 930 watts
- HAAT: 254 meters (833 ft)

Links
- Public license information: Public file; LMS
- Webcast: Listen Live
- Website: cbssportsradio1053.com

KINB (105.3 FM) is a sports radio station licensed to Kingfisher, Oklahoma, United States, and serving the Oklahoma City area. The station is owned by Perry Publishing and Broadcasting.

== History ==
This station officially signed on July 6, 2000 as Contemporary Christian as "The Light 105-Dot-3 FM" with call letters KLGH. On April 1, 2002 at midnight, the format of WWLS 640 was simulcast on 105.3 after Citadel Broadcasting agreed to purchase the station. The Sports Animal (Sports Talk) format moved to KLGH on April 11, 2002 and the station would later change its calls to WWLS-FM on October 1, 2002. On August 23, 2002 the station began running an alternative rock format at night while keeping the sports talk format during the day. When broadcasting the alternative rock format, it adopted the moniker of K-Spy, an allusion to the former alt-rock format on KSPI-FM in Stillwater, OK known as The Spy. The station would eventually drop the "K" and also employed a few former DJ's from KSPI's alt-rock days. On December 25, 2002, The Spy took over the frequency full-time and The Sports Animal returned to 104.9 the next day. On the 25 and January 1, 2003, The Spy was simulcast on Citadel sisters KATT-FM 100.5, KYIS 98.9 and KKWD 97.9 and briefly on KQBL 104.9 (on Christmas Day only). The station adopted the call letters KSYY in March 2003. On June 25, 2004 at 4 p.m., Citadel flipped from Alternative to Regional Mexican and became La Indomable 105.3 as KINB. The station later was simulcast on the AM dial at 930 WKY, but was broken off following the Citadel-ABC Radio merger. On January 7, 2009 105.3 flipped to Spanish ESPN radio as an ESPN Deportes affiliate and moved the La Indomable Regional Mexican music format to 930 WKY-AM.

On November 23, 2009, at Midnight, the station dropped the ESPN Deportes format, and 105.3 The Spy returned as the station was LMA'd to Ferris O'Brien. The first song on the revived Spy was "Revolution" by The Cult. This restored the alternative rock format to Oklahoma City following the flip of KHBZ-FM (now KOKQ) to active rock in 2009, only to dump active rock on December 29 that same year.

On December 3, 2010, the following message was sent out on The Spy's Facebook page: "To be specific: yes, we're no longer broadcasting on 105.3 FM. It's too detailed to go into at any length right now... but we want the airwaves back, and we're working on it. Thanks."

Last Bastion Station Trust, "a clearing house" for stations sold by Citadel in compliance with Federal Communications Commission regulations after Citadel purchased ABC Radio in 2007, resumed possession of KINB in December 2010 following the unsuccessful negotiation of sale to Ferris O'Brien. Last Bastion Station Trust maintained the alternative music format, continuing to operate KINB as "The Spy" until March 2011. Ferris O'Brien concurrently operated his version of "The Spy" as an on-line station. As of August 20, 2012, "The Spy" can be heard on weeknights and sporadically on the weekends on KOSU.

On March 4, 2011, KINB flipped from modern rock to adult standards as 105.3 The Martini. The first song on 105.3 The Martini was Star Dust by Louis Armstrong And His Orchestra.

On March 12, 2013, KINB switched to CBS Sports Radio as "105.3 The Pro".

On March 31, 2017, KINB was sold to Perry Publishing and Broadcasting for $225,000.

On June 1, 2017, Perry closed on the purchase of KINB; they dropped the branding "The Pro" and rebranded the station "CBS Sports Radio 105.3".
