= KMKZ =

KMKZ may refer to:

- KMKZ (FM), a defunct radio station (88.7 FM) licensed to serve Red Feather Lakes, Colorado, United States
- KMKZ-LP, a radio station (104.7 FM) licensed to serve Loveland, Colorado
- KZLS (AM), a radio station (1640 AM) licensed to serve Enid, Oklahoma, United States, which held the call sign KMKZ from 2000 to 2003
- KQOB, a radio station (96.9 FM) licensed to serve Enid, Oklahoma, which held the call sign KMKZ in 2000
- KXLS, a radio station (95.7 FM) licensed to serve Lahoma, Oklahoma, which held the call sign KMKZ from 1993 to 2000
