= The Spy FM =

The Spy
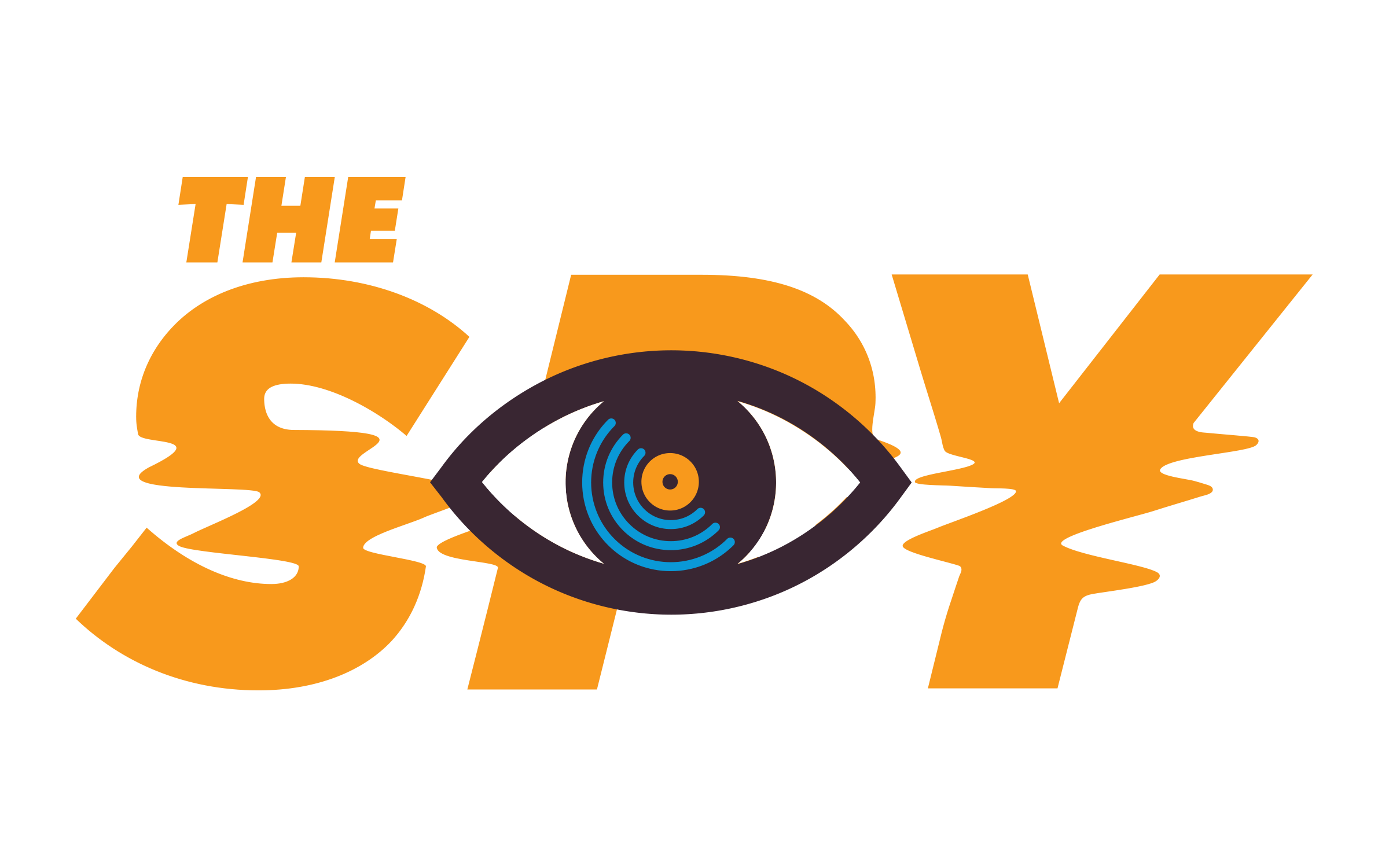

Programming
- Format: Alternative

Ownership
- Owner: The Spy Media, LLC

History
- First air date: 2009

Links
- Webcast: Listen Live
- Website: www.thespyfm.com

The Spy is an independent, online radio station, headquartered in Oklahoma City, Oklahoma, United States, that specializes in alternative and indie rock. The station is closely affiliated with KOSU, which broadcasts The Spy's digital stream daily from 7 PM to 5 AM on their FM airwaves (91.7FM Oklahoma City, 107.5FM Tulsa, 88.3FM Stillwater, 94.9FM Ponca City).

In addition to the alternative rock that is normally played on The Spy, the station also broadcasts over a dozen weekly programs dedicated to particular musical genres, including reggae, red dirt, Americana, New Wave, hip hop, all-vinyl, and more.

== History ==
In 1998, Ferris O'Brien took over as the Program Director at 93.7 The Spy (KSPI-FM in Stillwater). When station owners took The Spy off the air in 2001, Ferris secured ownership of the brand and moved it to Oklahoma City.

In 2002, Citadel Communications launched a deep alternative format radio station (KSYY, now KINB) and asked O'Brien to take the helm. The station was reformatted in June 2004, but O'Brien kept “Spy Radio” on the air as a once weekly specialty show on KATT 100.5 The Katt.

In 2009, O'Brien began operating 105.3 FM in a lease marketing agreement with Citadel and relaunched The Spy. When a purchase agreement fell through in December 2010, he took the station completely digital at thespyfm.com.

In 2012, The Spy and KOSU established a new partnership that allowed The Spy to return to the FM dial.
