= WWLS =

WWLS may refer to:

- WWLS-FM, a radio station (98.1 FM) licensed to serve The Village, Oklahoma, United States
- KWPN (AM), a radio station (640 AM) licensed to serve Moore, Oklahoma, which held the call sign WWLS from 1981 to 2012
