= KRMP =

Radio station in Oklahoma City, U.S.

Coordinates: 35°23′14″N 97°29′56″W

- Oklahoma City, Oklahoma; United States
- Broadcast area: Oklahoma City Metroplex
- Frequency: 1140 kHz
- Branding: Heart & Soul 92.1 & 1140

Programming
- Format: Urban adult contemporary

Ownership
- Owner: Perry Publishing and Broadcasting
- Sister stations: KVSP, KINB

History
- First air date: 1946
- Former call signs: KLPR; KATT; KPRW; KVSP
- Call sign meaning: Russell M. Perry, station owner

Technical information
- Licensing authority: FCC
- Facility ID: 63794
- Class: D
- Power: AM: 1,000 watts day
- Translator: 92.1 K221FQ (Oklahoma City)

Links
- Public license information: Public file; LMS
- Webcast: Listen Live
- Website: okcheartandsoul.com

KRMP (1140 AM) is an urban adult contemporary radio station in Oklahoma City, Oklahoma. The station is owned by Perry Publishing and Broadcasting. The station's studios are located at Perry Plaza II in the Eastside district of Northeast Oklahoma City, and the transmitter site is in the southeast side of the city. KRMP broadcasts by day at 1,000 watts using a non-directional antenna.

1140 AM is a United States and Mexican clear channel frequency. For that reason, KRMP is a daytimer, required to go off the air at sunset when radio waves travel further. That stops KRMP from interfering with the frequency's two Class A stations, WRVA in Richmond, Virginia, and XEMR in Monterrey, Mexico. For listeners wanting to hear KRMP around the clock, programming is heard on FM translator K221FQ at 92.1 MHz.

== History ==
KRMP first signed on the air as KLPR. The station went through various formats such as Country and Disco. The call letters later flipped to KATT and started simulcasting Rock with its former sister station KATT-FM 100.5. In the Capitol Hill High School in the 1953-1954 yearbooks they sponsor the station.

In the Spring of 1986, the station dropped simulcasting with KATT-FM and flipped to Urban Contemporary as KPRW "Power 1140". This move came when former Black/Urban station KAEZ-107.7 (Now Sports Radio KRXO-FM) went off the air in the Fall of 1985. KPRW had great success with its Urban format, it even scored a 7 share in the ratings making it one of the Top 10 stations in Oklahoma City despite the station being a daytimer. By late 1989 and the early part of 1990, KPRW started losing some of its audience to Top 40 stations KJYO "KJ-103" and KZBS "Z-99" (Now Hot AC KYIS) which were both leaning heavily Dance and Rhythmic at the time. By the latter part of the early 1990s KJYO and KZBS both started changing directions in their formats. KJYO went back to a Mainstream Top 40 direction and KZBS started leaning towards an Adult Top 40 direction, eventually becoming Hot AC KYIS "98.9 Kiss-FM", but it was too late for KPRW to regain its audience. Around that time KPRW dropped its Urban format and became a Business News/Talk format as "Power Business News 1140" once again leaving Oklahoma City without an Urban station. The format lasted for about 2 years when it was dropped and KPRW started simulcasting Rock with KATT-FM again.

In 1993, Oklahoma City businessman Russell M. Perry, founder of the weekly newspaper The Black Chronicle purchased KPRW and changed the format back to Urban as KVSP "Power Jammin' 1140" filling the void as the Urban station in Oklahoma City, since the market had been without such a station since the early 1990s. The station once again had success by becoming the Top 10 station in Oklahoma City. KVSP was faced with competition in 2000, when new Rhythmic Top 40 KKWD "Wild 97dot9" (Now at 104.9) signed on the air (Changing from Smooth Jazz KCYI) leaning heavily towards Hip-Hop & R&B with a mix of Dance and some Pop, this hurt KVSP a little bit. By this time the station signed an agreement with Clear Channel to purchase airtime on KEBC-1340 and broadcast KVSP's Urban format from 7pm-7am right after KVSP signed off at sunset on AM 1140 calling it "The Power Jammin' Network".

In 2004, Perry Broadcasting purchased Country station KRPT-103.5 in Anadarko, Oklahoma, the signal was upgraded to target Oklahoma City. The KVSP call letters and Urban format were moved to the FM dial and it became "Power 103.5" targeting a younger audience with its format. That same year AM 1140 changed to its current format Urban Adult Contemporary as KRMP "The Touch 1140". KRMP also airs Talk and Infomercials in certain dayparts with addition to music. It also airs Tom Joyner in the morning and previously aired Michael Baisden in the afternoon until his cancellation at the end of March 2013 and replaced the show with local talent the “WYLD” Child Scott Wright who was brought over from sister station KVSP where he was doing an afternoon program called “The Freak Show” which he had been doing ever since 2000 when KVSP was on 1140.With the change “The Freak Show” was brought over from KVSP and was back airing on 1140.

In 2012, KRMP relaunched the station as "Heart & Soul 92.1 and 1140" with the addition of translator K221FQ on 92.1, allowing the station to broadcast 24 hours on FM once AM 1140 signs off at sunset. In 2019 Local Talent The “WYLD” Child Scott Wright who was put in the afternoon slot after The Michael BaisdenShow was cancelled was moved to the midday slot and the syndicated “Chubb Rock Afternoons with Siman Baby” Show was put in the afternoon slot. In January 2020, when the Tom Joyner Morning Show went off the air for good The Rickey Smiley Morning Show was brought over from sister station KVSP. Until 2023 This was the Following Lineup: The Rickey Smiley Morning Show from 6:00AM to 9:00AM. “The Open Mic Talk Show” A community based talk show for listeners to call in and express their opinions on topics airs from 9:00AM to 11:00AM. Freak Show Radio with the “WYLD” Child Scott Wright from 11:00AM to 2:00PM. The Chubb Rock Show from 2:00PM to 6:00PM. The D.Chappel Show Monday-Thursday 6:00PM to 10:00PM. The Quiet Storm with Lenny Green from 10:00PM to 2:00AM. On Saturdays it airs The Rickey Smiley Morning Show's Rickey Smiley's Weekend Jumpoff from 10:00AM to 12:00PM and Diggin’ in the crates with Chubb Rock & Tha Needle Droppas from 6:00PM to 8:00PM. On Sundays it airs gospel music as Down Home Gospel from 6:00AM to 2:00PM. From 9:00AM to 11:00AM services at local churches are aired. From 11:00AM to 1:00PM The Syndicated “The Dorinda Clark-Cole Radio Show” is aired. From 1:00PM to 4:00PM The Syndicated “The Marvin Sapp Radio show is aired” From 4:00PM to 6:00PM The Syndicated “In the City With Mike Glover” Show hosted by KWTV reporter Mike Glover is aired. From 6:00PM to 8:00PM a two-hour local program called “Lincoln Park” is aired where music from Motown as well as the 70s, 80s, and 90s is aired. After “Lincoln Park” the station goes back to playing Urban A.C. In January 2023 The syndicated “In The City With Mike Glover” stopped airing and instead Urban A.C music is aired in the time slot. In March 2023 The Freak Show With “WYLD” Child Scott Wright was moved to its old 2-6PM in order for Scott able to connect with the community and allow more people to listen to the show. The Chubb Rock Show was moved to the 11AM-2PM time slot. During commercial break on The Rickey Smiley Morning Show and during The Freak Show With The “WYLD” Child Scott Wright Traffic reports are given by reporters @ Total Traffic in Dallas and is branded as “Sky Jammer One.”

== Translator ==
Call sign	Frequency	City of license	FID	ERP (W)	HAAT	Class	FCC info
K221FQ	(92.1 MHz) FM	Oklahoma City, Oklahoma	77231	99 watts	386 m (1,266 ft)	D	LMS
