= Jack Elliott (broadcaster) =

Jack Elliott (born Ray Baldy) is a radio personality in Oklahoma City, Oklahoma. He began his broadcast career in the early 1970s working at smaller radio stations in the suburban Chicago area where he was born. He graduated from Columbia College Chicago with Bachelor of Arts degree in radio and television communications.

In 1976, Elliott went to Phoenix, Arizona, where he worked at the radio station KRIZ. His eventual departure from Phoenix was prompted by the sale of the radio station in 1978. He was offered an on-air position with WKY in Oklahoma City, where he stayed for 12 years, through several format changes. In 1990, he was fired from WKY as another format change was about to happen. He said the firing was the "best thing to ever happen" to him.

Three weeks later, he began doing a two-person morning radio show on KOQL FM in Oklahoma City, then an oldies station, with long-time acquaintance Ron Williams. Three years later, KOQL management made the switch to a country music format, and the pair moved to KYIS FM in Oklahoma City. The "Jack & Ron" partnership was later moved to co-owned talk radio station KQOB.

Jack & Ron have won the Oklahoma Association of Broadcasters "Best Radio Personalities of the Year" award twice. They have won the American Women in Radio & TV Award for "Best Radio Personalities" three times. Additionally, the two have set a record by winning the Oklahoma Gazette "Best Of OKC" Radio Personalities award twelve times, and they have won the Readers Choice Poll in The Oklahoman a record six times. In 2010 the duo received the award of Best of the Best in Radio from Oklahoma Magazine. And in October 2010, they were presented the "Star" award from the Oklahoma Media Network for Best Radio Personalities. Again in 2012 & 2013 Jack & Ron were voted Best Radio Personalities by readers of the Oklahoma Gazette. They have now won that award a record twelve times.

In addition to his work as a radio host, Elliott has performed as TV spokesperson for numerous auto dealerships and is a voice-over artist with hundreds of commercial productions utilizing his voice. He has worked as a narrator, actor, and entertainer.

== Personal life ==
Elliott's father was Chicago's first helicopter traffic reporter for WGN radio in 1958. Known as Flying Officer Leonard Baldy, he and his pilot were killed in a helicopter crash during the afternoon reports on May 2, 1960.

He is married and has a daughter named Brittany Baldy Hlubek (married).
