= I100 =

I100 may refer to:

- WIII (FM) (branded as "I-100"), a radio station serving Ithaca and Cortland, New York, United States
- WJTQ (formerly branded as "i100"), a radio station serving Pensacola, Florida and Mobile, Alabama, United States
- i100, a sister website of The Independent
