= KCRC =

KCRC may refer to:

- KCRC (AM), a radio station licensed to Enid, Oklahoma, United States
- Kowloon-Canton Railway Corporation
