= KHRK (FM) =

Radio station in Hennessey, Oklahoma

- Hennessey, Oklahoma; United States
- Frequency: 97.7 MHz (HD Radio via KWFF-HD3)
- Branding: 97.7 The Hawk

Programming
- Format: Classic rock

Ownership
- Owner: Chisholm Trail Broadcasting Co
- Sister stations: KCRC, KNID, KWOF, KXLS, KZLS KQOB, KWFF

History
- First air date: 2018
- Former call signs: KHEO (2018)
- Call sign meaning: Close visual analogue of "Hawk" ("R" substituting for "A")

Technical information
- Licensing authority: FCC
- Facility ID: 198763
- Class: A
- ERP: 3,900 watts
- HAAT: 100 metres (330 ft)
- Transmitter coordinates: 36°12′58.50″N 97°54′53.90″W

Links
- Public license information: Public file; LMS
- Webcast: Listen Live
- Website: KHRK Online

KHRK (97.7 FM) is a radio station licensed to serve the community of Hennessey, Oklahoma. The station is owned by Chisholm Trail Broadcasting Co. It airs a classic rock format.

The station was assigned the call sign KHEO by the Federal Communications Commission on August 17, 2018. The station changed its call sign to KHRK on October 19, 2018. KHRK programming is also heard on co-owned KWFF 99.7-HD-3 digital channel.
