= WNYY =

Radio station in Ithaca, New York

- Ithaca, New York; United States
- Broadcast area: Ithaca area
- Frequency: 1470 kHz
- Branding: Pure Oldies 94.1 & AM 1470

Programming
- Format: Oldies

Ownership
- Owner: Saga Communications; (Saga Communications of New England, LLC)
- Sister stations: WFIZ, WQNY, WHCU, WYXL, WIII

History
- First air date: 1956
- Former call signs: WTKO (1956–2005)

Technical information
- Licensing authority: FCC
- Facility ID: 32391
- Class: B
- Power: 5,000 watts (day); 1,000 watts (night)
- Transmitter coordinates: 42°23′30.3″N 76°28′28.8″W
- Translator: 94.1 W231DK (Ithaca)

Links
- Public license information: Public file; LMS
- Webcast: Listen live
- Website: pureoldies941.com

WNYY (1470 AM) is a radio station broadcasting an oldies format. Licensed to Ithaca, New York, United States, the station is owned by Saga Communications, and operates as part of its Cayuga Radio Group serving the Ithaca area.

== History ==
WNYY, most commonly known as "Pure Oldies 94.1" was owned by a local company as part of an AM/FM combo with WQNY 103.7 FM, then under the call letters of WTKO and featuring an oldies format. The AM/FM combo was one of two in the Ithaca market - the other being what is now co-owned WYXL 97.3 FM and WHCU 870 AM. The two combos were combined under the Eagle Broadcasting Company, before Saga bought out the company and its four stations in 2005.

The WNYY call letters were put in place after Saga's purchase in 2005, and it was initially launched as a sports station. WNYY also carried programming from the now-defunct Air America network, which filed for bankruptcy in January 2010. After its iteration as a sports station, WNYY ran an all-syndicated lineup consisting mostly of progressive hosts, with some exceptions (The Dave Ramsey Show being the most prominent, airing in afternoon drive). From March 2010 through January 2017, WNYY was one of several progressive talk stations in Saga Communications' portfolio, others including WHMP and its two simulcast partners in western Massachusetts, and WKVT in southeastern Vermont.

WNYY's return to the FM airwaves coincided with the launch of sister station WQNY's Progressive Talk on its HD2 channel. WNYY had been on the W277BS 103.3 FM translator of WYXL before Saga began using the frequency for WYXL's HD2 channel, Hits 103.3. The use of WQNY-HD2 overcame a tight night pattern on the 1470 AM frequency.

In January 2017, Saga announced that it would change WNYY's format back to oldies on February 1. The company stated that many of the programs carried by the station were no longer in syndication, rendering the station unable to provide a full schedule of progressive talk programming; in an unusual move, Saga Communications directed listeners to community radio station WRFI and to the Internet, where many of the shows that are no longer syndicated now air.

On February 1, 2017, WNYY changed their format from progressive talk to oldies, branded as "Pure Oldies 94.1" (simulcast on FM translator W231DK 94.1 FM Ithaca).
