= Rain (The Cult song) =

Single by the Cult

from the album Love
- Released: 27 September 1985
- Recorded: July 1985
- Genre: Gothic rock; hard rock
- Length: 3:55
- Label: Beggars Banquet
- Songwriters: Ian Astbury; Billy Duffy
- Producer: Steve Brown

The Cult singles chronology
"She Sells Sanctuary" (1985)	"Rain" (1985)	"Revolution" (1985)

Music video
- "Rain" on YouTube

"Rain" is a song by the English rock band the Cult. It was released on 27 September 1985 by Beggars Banquet Records, as the second single from the band's second studio album, Love (1985), and reached No. 17 on the UK singles chart.

== Performance history ==
Despite the song's popularity with the band's audience, and it being one of its more commercially successful single releases, after performing it on 24 November 1989 at Wembley Arena Astbury asked the crowd: "So you like that one?", and after it cheered in response, he responded with "Well, personally I don't but there you are..."

== Critical reception ==
AllMusic wrote: "[...] "Rain" finds the group's deliciously bombastic Big Rock approach already firmly in place but tempered by a genuinely tantalizing melody.

== Alternative versions ==
An extended remix was recorded by the band titled "(Here Comes The) Rain".

== Track listing ==
Vinyl 7-inch

- A Side : "Rain"
  B Side : "Little Face"

Vinyl 12-inch

- A Side: "Rain", "Little Face"
  * B Side: "(Here Comes The) Rain"
