= Phil Boyce =

American radio executive

Phil Boyce is an American program director for Salem Communications. He had previously served in the same capacity for NewsTalkRadio WABC (AM) in New York City, as well Vice President of news/talk programming for ABC Radio and program director for Talk Radio Network.

Boyce is currently the VP/Dir of Spoken Word for Salem Communications. In this capacity Boyce supervises the 24 NewsTalk stations owned by Salem, in addition to the 40 Christian Talk and Teach stations, and the 11 Business Talk stations. Boyce is directly responsible for on air programming at WNYM and WMCA Radio in New York City, and now works out of the station's Manhattan studios and offices.

== Overview ==
Boyce programmed WABC Radio programs as well as nationally syndicated ABC Radio shows, including The Sean Hannity Show and The Mark Levin Show. Boyce handled programming at all ABC Radio news/talk stations, including KABC in Los Angeles, WLS in Chicago and WMAL in Washington, D.C. He reported to general manager Timothy McCarthy at WABC, as well as to Mitch Dolan, president of the ABC Radio Station Group on the corporate level.

In 2009, Boyce joined TRN, transforming the network from one that specialized in à la carte syndication to a straight 24-hour network. Boyce launched programs such as America's Morning News (a show hosted by Melanie Morgan, who was well known for her time at ABC-owned KSFO), while dropping weaker programs such as Tammy Bruce. In contrast to trying to sell individual shows, under Boyce, TRN has been offering its entire lineup to single stations, such as KDXE, which carries exclusively TRN programming. The Masters family are the owners and operators of TRN.

Boyce was raised in Pueblo, Colorado.

== Radio career ==
=== Career beginnings ===
- WKY, Oklahoma City
- KFEL, Pueblo, Colorado
- KDZA-FM, Pueblo
- KVMN-FM, Pueblo

=== News director ===
- KHOW, Denver
- KFH, Wichita
- KYFM, Bartlesville, Oklahoma
- KIMN, Denver

=== Vice president for news/talk ===
- KGO, San Francisco
- KSFO, San Francisco
- KABC, Los Angeles
- WBAP, Dallas
- WLS, Chicago

=== Program director for news/talk ===
- WJR, Detroit
- WMAL, Washington D.C.

== WABC Radio timeline ==
- April 1995 — Joins WABC Radio as program director, replacing John Mainelli.
- 1996 — Creates WABC’s morning team of Curtis Sliwa and Ron Kuby.
- 1997 — Boyce hires Sean Hannity, then moves him to PM drive-time in 1998.
- March 11, 2005 — Promoted to vice president of programming for ABC Radio's news/talk stations, while keeping his title as operations manager and program director at WABC Radio.
- November 2004 — Brings back Coast to Coast AM to the overnight shift.
- December 2005 — Brings back the oldies to WABC on Saturday nights with Saturday Night Oldies.
- October 9, 2008 — last day at WABC and ABC Radio.
- February 3, 2012 - First day at Salem Communications at VP, Director Spoken Word Format

== Radio industry honors ==
- Radio Ink Magazine's top ten Major Market Program Directors in America for 2001, 2002, 2003, 2004, 2005
- Radio and Records Industry Achievement Award for News/Talk Program Director of the Year for 2003
- WABC selected as Radio and Records top News/Talk Station of the Year for 2003
- WABC selected as Legendary Station of the Year by the National Association of Broadcasters for 2004
- Radio and Records Magazine News/Talk Programmer of the Year, 2004 and 2005
