= KWPN (AM) =

Sports radio station in Oklahoma City

- Moore, Oklahoma; United States
- Broadcast area: Oklahoma City metropolitan area
- Frequency: 640 kHz
- Branding: ESPN Radio 640

Programming
- Format: Sports radio
- Affiliations: ESPN Radio

Ownership
- Owner: Cumulus Media; (Radio License Holding CBC, LLC)
- Sister stations: KATT-FM; KKWD; KYIS; WKY; WWLS-FM

History
- First air date: September 16, 1922
- Former call signs: WNAD (1922-1981); WWLS (1981-2012)
- Former frequencies: 1010 kHz (1929–1941)
- Call sign meaning: "ESPN"

Technical information
- Licensing authority: FCC
- Facility ID: 22190
- Class: B
- Power: 5,000 watts (day); 1,000 watts (night)
- Transmitter coordinates: 35°17′21.2″N 97°30′9.1″W

Links
- Public license information: Public file; LMS

KWPN (640 kHz, "ESPN Radio 640") is a commercial radio station licensed to serve Moore, Oklahoma. The station is owned by Cumulus Media, and airs a sports radio format. KWPN's studios and offices are on NW 64th Street in Northwest Oklahoma City.

KWPN's transmitter is off West Indian Hills Road in Norman, and broadcasts with a power of 5,000 watts by day. At night, KWPN must reduce power to 1,000 watts, to avoid interference with KFI a clear-channel station in Los Angeles. A directional antenna is used at all times.

== History ==
=== University of Oklahoma ===
On September 26, 1922, the station signed on as sequentially assigned WNAD in Norman. It was owned by the University of Oklahoma, with its studios located in Science Hall. In the early days of broadcasting, several universities put non-commercial radio stations on the air as a service to students, faculty and the local community. From 1929 to 1941, WNAD broadcast on 1010 kilocycles and was required to go off the air at sunset.

In 1941, when the North American Regional Broadcasting Agreement (NARBA) was enacted, the station moved to 640 kHz. Being lower on the dial gave WNAD a wider coverage area, though the station was still required to be off the air at night, to protect 50,000-watt clear channel KFI in Los Angeles, because at night Medium frequency radio signals travel greater distances.

=== Ownership changes ===
In 1973, after the university put an FM station KGOU on the air, it decided to sell the AM station. WNAD was acquired by Oklahoma Communications, Inc., and became a Mutual Broadcasting System network affiliate.

The station was acquired by Norman Broadcasting in 1981. It switched its call sign to WWLS, named after Norman Broadcasting's owner, Larry Steckline. It is unusual for stations in Oklahoma to have call letters beginning with a "W", as nearly all start with a "K." However, since the station traces its history back to 1922, when Oklahoma was in W territory, the station was granted new call letters beginning with a W from the Federal Communications Commission.

=== Sports radio ===
In 1989, WWLS was acquired by Fox Broadcasting. It was not associated with the Fox Television Network, but owned by local businessman John Fox. A sports radio format was started. The new management changed the station's city of license with the FCC to Moore. This was coupled with permission to broadcast around the clock at 1,000 watts. A few years later, daytime power was boosted to 5,000 watts.

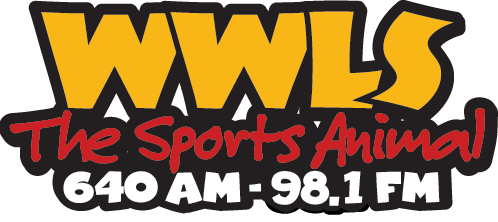
Former logo used until 2012, as WWLS-AM

In 1999, WWLS was acquired by Citadel Broadcasting, the forerunner to today's Cumulus Broadcasting. It flipped to a sports radio format, calling itself "The Sports Animal." It later received an FM simulcast on 98.1, which became WWLS-FM. On April 2, 2012, WWLS AM split from its "Sports Animal" simulcast with WWLS-FM and switched to mostly programming from ESPN Radio under new call letters KWPN. WWLS-FM continued with mostly local sports programming on weekdays, and later began simulcasting on co-owned WKY. On nights and weekends, all three stations often carry the same ESPN Radio programming.
