= KWFF =

- Mustang, Oklahoma; United States
- Broadcast area: Oklahoma City metropolitan area
- Frequency: 99.7 MHz (HD Radio)
- Branding: 99.7 The Wolf

Programming
- Format: Country
- Subchannels: HD2: Rooster Red Dirt 24/7; HD3: KHRK; HD4: KTGS
- Affiliations: Compass Media Networks; United Stations Radio Networks

Ownership
- Owner: Champlin Broadcasting, Inc.
- Sister stations: KCRC, KNID, KWOF, KXLS, KZLS, KQOB

History
- First air date: February 1, 1981; 45 years ago (as KXLS Alva, Oklahoma)
- Former call signs: KXLS (1981–2000); KNID (2000–2008); KZLS (2008–2013); KNAH (2013–2023)

Technical information
- Licensing authority: FCC
- Facility ID: 37123
- Class: C2
- ERP: 47,000 watts
- HAAT: 155 meters (509 ft)
- Transmitter coordinates: 35.59167°N 97.86611°W

Links
- Public license information: Public file; LMS
- Webcast: Listen Live Listen Live (HD2)
- Website: www.997thewolf.com

KWFF (99.7 FM) is a commercial radio station airing a gold-based country radio format. The station is licensed to Mustang, Oklahoma, and serves the Oklahoma City metropolitan area. It is owned by Champlin Broadcasting, Inc.

KWFF's studios and offices are on NW 64th Street in Oklahoma City. The transmitter is off Manning Road in El Reno, Oklahoma.

== History ==
On February 1, 1981, the station signed on the air. It was originally licensed to Alva, Oklahoma, and used the call sign KXLS. The station was owned by Zumma Broadcasting and aired a middle of the road music format, primarily serving Enid and surrounding communities.

The owners eventually got permission from the Federal Communications Commission (FCC) to move the station closer to Oklahoma City to improve its value, with the ability to sell advertising in the more lucrative, larger radio market. The transmitter was relocated northwest of Oklahoma City, with the city of license changed to the suburb Mustang, Oklahoma.

Former logo

In December 2022, KWFF added The Gospel Station to its HD4 subchannel.

The station previously aired an oldies format as KZLS “True Oldies 99.7". It switched to classic country in late September 2013, using Envision Radio Networks' Hank FM branding.

On May 26, 2023, the then-KNAH rebranded as "99.7 The Wolf", and shifted its playlist to include more current country music, while still maintaining a classic-heavy focus. The station changed its call sign to KWFF on July 2, 2023.
