= Leonard Baldy =

American law enforcement officer

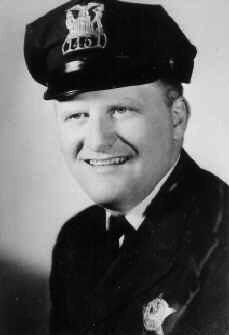

Leonard Frank Baldy (February 15, 1927 – May 2, 1960) was a Chicago Police Department officer who became the city's first helicopter traffic reporter. His sometimes comical look at Chicago's traffic problems made him a household name. His peers gave him the nickname "Flying Officer Leonard Baldy". He died in a fiery crash on May 2, 1960, when his helicopter threw a rotor blade and crashed in a railroad yard near Milwaukee Avenue and Hubbard Street.

A native of Chicago, he graduated from Lane Technical College Preparatory High School (also known as Lane Tech) and was a World War II veteran who served as a Signalman on USS Markab. Baldy gained early recognition in his police career for being the first patrolman in the United States to experiment with and use the, now famous, radar gun to detect the speed of vehicles (April 1954). He also wrote the first ticket in the world for speeding using a radar device. As a patrolman in the mid-'50s he appeared in a television commercial directing traffic.

He became the most visible department spokesperson when he provided lectures and taught classes to civic groups, organizations, and educational institutions on the topic of traffic safety. He provided the first helicopter traffic report over WGN radio in November 1958.

Baldy gained fame during the Our Lady of the Angels School Fire, in December 1958, when he broadcast his observations from his helicopter above the scene. He provided traffic instructions over the radio to fire and ambulance vehicles trying to reach the fire through Chicago's congested streets. Both Baldy and WGN radio received public service awards from the National Transportation Safety Board for their efforts.

After his death, he was elected to the American Police Hall of Fame and had his badge number retired.

Forty-six years after his death, the citizens of Chicago remembered him with the honor of renaming a street "Leonard Baldy Way". Chicago newspaper columnist, Neil Steinberg, declared "if ever a Chicago police officer was a celebrity, it was Patrolman Leonard Baldy."

Chicago Police Superintendent, Phillip Cline, said, "People who couldn't name the police superintendent, knew who Len Baldy was."

One of Officer Baldy's sons became noted radio personality, Jack Elliott

In 2006, his son, Tim Baldy, published a biography entitled Chicago's Finest.
