= KWOF (FM) =

- Waukomis, Oklahoma; United States
- Frequency: 106.3 MHz
- Branding: 106.3 The Wolf

Programming
- Format: Classic country

Ownership
- Owner: Chisholm Trail Broadcasting Co
- Sister stations: KCRC, KHRK, KNID, KXLS, KZLS, KWFF, KQOB

History
- Former call signs: KWEO (2018)
- Call sign meaning: The Wolf, a common branding for country stations

Technical information
- Licensing authority: FCC
- Facility ID: 198764
- Class: A
- ERP: 6,000 watts
- HAAT: 100 metres (330 ft)
- Transmitter coordinates: 36°12′58.6″N 97°54′55.1″W

Links
- Public license information: Public file; LMS
- Webcast: Listen live
- Website: www.1063thewolf.com

KWOF (106.3 FM, "106.3 The Wolf") is a radio station licensed to serve the community of Waukomis, Oklahoma. The station is owned by Chisholm Trail Broadcasting Co and airs a classic country format.

The station was assigned the call sign KWEO by the Federal Communications Commission on August 17, 2018. The station changed its call sign to KWOF on October 19, 2018, prior to receiving its license, calls recently released by Broomfield, Colorado-licensed KKSE-FM (92.5) in the Denver market after they switched from their own country format to sports radio.
