= Farid Suleman =

American businessman

- Born: age 73
- Occupations: CEO and chairman of Citadel Broadcasting

Farid Suleman has been a director of Fairway Group Holdings since 2012. Before that, he was the chairman and CEO of Citadel Broadcasting from March 2002 until the company's acquisition by Cumulus Media in 2011. He previously spent 16 years working for Infinity Broadcasting Corporation (now CBS Radio) and 12 years at Westwood One.

== History ==
Suleman is a graduate of the University of Nottingham in England, and is a chartered accountant and a CPA.

Suleman was a director of Westwood One from February 1994 to February 2006, and executive vice president and CFO from February 1994 to March 2002. Suleman was also appointed to the positions of senior vice president and chief financial officer of the CBS Station Group in June 1997. In CBS, he was later named senior vice president, finance, in August 1998.

He was executive vice president, chief financial officer, treasurer and a director of Infinity Broadcasting, one of the largest advertising companies in the United States, from September 1998 to February 2001 when Infinity was acquired by Viacom. From February 2001 to February 2002, Suleman was appointed president and chief executive officer of Infinity.

Suleman was the chairman and CEO of Citadel Broadcasting from March 2002 until the company's acquisition by Cumulus Media in 2011. In late 2004, Suleman made headlines by cutting Howard Stern's radio show from four Citadel stations, citing Stern's frequent discussions regarding his upcoming move to Sirius Satellite Radio. In 2007, he was nominated for the Group Executive of the Year award by Radio & Records magazine.
