= WYBY =

Coordinates: 42°33′22″N 76°09′17″W

- Cortland, New York; United States
- Frequency: 920 kHz

Ownership
- Owner: Bible Broadcasting Network

History
- First air date: November 15, 1947
- Last air date: August 2, 2024
- Former call signs: WKRT (1947–2007)

Technical information
- Facility ID: 9428
- Class: B
- Power: 1,000 watts (day); 500 watts (night)

WYBY (920 AM) was a radio station in Cortland, New York, United States, which broadcast from 1947 to 2024. The station signed on in 1947 as WKRT, which were its call letters for 60 years. The station had several formats, including adult standards and talk. In 2007, owner Citadel Broadcasting sold its Ithaca cluster to Saga Communications. Saga retained WIII, WKRT's sister FM station, but due to ownership limits, it spun off WKRT to the Bible Broadcasting Network (BBN), which changed the call sign to WYBY and began rebroadcasting its Christian talk and teaching programming. BBN took the station silent for technical reasons on August 2, 2024, and surrendered its broadcast license a month later.

== History ==
On May 15, 1947, the Cortland Broadcasting Company applied to start a new, 1,000-watt daytime-only radio station to serve Cortland. The Federal Communications Commission (FCC) approved the application on July 17, 1947, and WKRT began broadcasting on 920 AM as well as WKRT-FM 99.9 on November 15, 1947. The AM station remained daytime-only until June 26, 1949, when the station began full-time operation; it had requested this before even going on the air.

In 1950, Radio Cortland, Inc., acquired WKRT from the Cortland Broadcasting Company. The company's officers included Robert Hope, a former general manager of an Alabama station, and Leighton A. Hope. Hope, who went on to become a state senator and deputy commissioner in the New York State Conservation Department, sold the WKRT stations to Crown Broadcasting of Williamsport, Pennsylvania, effective February 2, 1978. For most of the 1980s, WKRT aired Music of Your Life, a syndicated adult standards format.

Crown Broadcasting sold the Cortland stations to Sun Radio Corporation in 1986 for $3.1 million. Under Sun, WKRT became a 24-hour operation. It switched to an oldies format of 1950s through 1970s music plus information programming by 1988. During the 1990s, WKRT and its sister FM went through various owners, but WKRT kept its format. In 1991, Northstar Broadcasting Corporation acquired the pair for $1.1 million. Pilot Communications bought the stations in 1998 then was purchased by Citadel Broadcasting in 1999. At the time of the Citadel acquisition, WKRT ranked 8th out of 15 radio stations serving Tompkins County.

Citadel flipped WKRT to talk in 2002, with syndicated programs including The Radio Factor, The Sean Hannity Show, and Jim Bohannon. In 2006, Citadel agreed to sell its two Ithaca stations to Saga Communications. To comply with ownership limits in the Ithaca market, Saga immediately decided to keep WIII (the former WKRT-FM) and earmarked WKRT for divestiture to the Bible Broadcasting Network (BBN). BBN continued to operate the station under the call sign WYBY until August 2, 2024, when it was taken silent for technical reasons. BBN had previously applied for special temporary authority because of problems with the directional array used to broadcast the signal at night. The broadcast license was submitted for cancellation on September 5, 2024.

The Federal Communications Commission cancelled the station’s license on September 12, 2024.
