= KNID (FM) =

Coordinates: 36.5370°N 98.0112°W

- North Enid, Oklahoma; United States
- Broadcast area: Enid, Oklahoma
- Frequency: 107.1 MHz
- Branding: Today's Best Country

Programming
- Format: Country

Ownership
- Owner: Chisholm Trail Broadcasting Co.
- Sister stations: KCRC, KXLS, KHRK, KWOF, KZLS, KWFF, KQOB

Technical information
- Licensing authority: FCC
- Facility ID: 165312
- Class: C3
- ERP: 14,000 watts
- HAAT: 137 meters (449 ft)

Links
- Public license information: Public file; LMS
- Webcast: Listen Live
- Website: www.1071knid.com

KNID (107.1 FM, "Today's Best Country") is a country music station serving the Enid, Oklahoma, area and is owned by Chisholm Trail Broadcasting, Co. The studios are located in Enid at 316 E. Willow.
