= Saturday Night Oldies =

American music and talk radio show

Saturday Night Oldies was a Saturday-night music and talk show on WABC Radio in New York City.

== History ==
WABC Radio (770 AM, New York City) played rock and roll from 1960 until May 10, 1982, before changing to a talk radio format. With talk shows not quite as popular on the weekend, Tim McCarthy, WABC President and General Manager, and Phil Boyce, Operations Manager and Program Director, decided to bring back the oldies music on Saturday nights. Saturday Night Oldies premiered on December 3, 2005, exactly six months after WCBS-FM (also in New York) dropped the oldies format on June 3, 2005.

Mark Simone hosted the show, which featured popular music from the late 1950s through the 1970s with an emphasis on songs that became popular, but have largely been forgotten. Original WABC jingles from the station's Top 40 era were played and Simone took phone calls and reads posts from the Message Board discussing a wide variety of events in popular culture from that time period.

The crew included Mike Gunzelman, the producer, and Mike Savilli on controls.

In July 2009 the show was renamed Saturday Night and shortened to 3 hours, airing from 6 PM to 9 PM. Newer music was played, as well as oldies, and a wider range of guests from the entertainment world were interviewed along with more discussion of entertainment issues.

In September 2010 the show was shortened to two hours, from 7 to 9 PM. It was also announced at that time that the Saturday Night show would soon be going national, and would be syndicated to stations in other cities.

The show was heard for the last time in December 2012 when Mark Simone resigned from WABC and joined WOR where he is heard Monday - Friday from 9 AM - 12 noon.

== Features ==
- B-sides of 45s played
- Beatlespectacular - in-depth look at the Beatles
- Fake breaks – old radio and TV commercials
- Mystery DJ - guess the voice of a radio deejay
- Stump the Host - callers try to stump the show’s host
- Triple plays - 3 songs from one recording artist played

== Guest interviews ==
- Herb Oscar Anderson
- Paul Anka
- Little Anthony
- Peter Asher and Gordon Waller of Peter & Gordon
- Frankie Avalon
- Burt Bacharach
- Frank Bank
- Shirley Bassey
- Pete Best
- Jay Black of Jay and the Americans
- Pat Boone
- Tom Bosley
- Dewey Bunnell of America
- Eric Burdon
- Glen Campbell
- The Captain & Tennille
- David Cassidy
- Dick Cavett
- Chubby Checker
- Lou Christie
- Petula Clark
- Tim Conway
- Stu Cook of Creedence Clearwater Revival
- Alice Cooper
- Pat Cooper
- Paul Cowsill of The Cowsills
- Tony Danza
- Bo Diddley
- Phyllis Diller
- Dion DiMucci
- Micky Dolenz
- Donovan
- Tony Dow
- Barbara Eden
- Fabian Forte
- Peter Frampton
- Art Garfunkel
- Bobby Goldsboro
- Lesley Gore
- Al Green
- Harry Harrison
- Deborah Harry
- Isaac Hayes
- Dwayne Hickman
- Janis Ian
- Dan Ingram
- Tommy James
- Frank Jeckell of the 1910 Fruitgum Company
- Davy Jones
- Shirley Jones
- Larry Kane
- Paul Kantner of Jefferson Airplane and Jefferson Starship
- Ben E. King and Charlie Thomas of the Drifters
- Frank Kingston Smith
- Robert Klein
- Bernie Kopell
- Billy J. Kramer
- Steve Lawrence
- David Letterman
- Eddie Levert and Walter Williams of The O'Jays
- Gary Lewis of the Playboys
- Little Richard
- Barry Livingston
- Airrion Love of The Stylistics
- Mike Love of The Beach Boys
- Ron Lundy
- Barry Manilow
- Jerry Mathers
- Johnny Mathis
- Marilyn McCoo and Billy Davis Jr. of The 5th Dimension
- Maureen McGovern
- Don McLean
- Ed McMahon
- George Michael
- Eddie Money
- Mary Tyler Moore
- Bruce Morrow
- David Nelson
- Julie Newmar
- Wayne Newton
- Peter Noone of the Herman's Hermits
- Tony Orlando
- Donny Osmond
- Gary Owens
- Lisa Marie Presley
- Gary Puckett
- Kenny Rogers
- Freddie Roman
- Linda Ronstadt
- Rose Marie
- Todd Rundgren
- Bobby Rydell
- Mort Sahl
- John Sebastian
- Neil Sedaka
- Bob Shannon
- Scott Shannon
- Patrick Simmons of The Doobie Brothers
- Nancy Sinatra
- Jaclyn Smith
- Frankie Valli
- Bobby Vinton
- Jimmy Webb
- Adam West
- Barry Williams
- Jo Anne Worley
- Alan Young
- John Zacherley
- Kool & the Gang
- Dick Van Dyke
- Joe Namath
- Gloria Gaynor

== Slogans ==
- "Saturday Night Oldies. What an awesome idea!"
- "Who else could pull this off?"
- "Around here we STILL play the hits!"
- "This is the station you grew up with. Who said you had to grow up?"
