= Russell Pierson =

American farm broadcaster

- Born: December 15, 1911; Mangum, Oklahoma
- Died: March 31, 2015 (aged 103); Oklahoma City, Oklahoma
- Education: Oklahoma State University
- Known for: Farm broadcasting pioneer, owner of Pierson Seed Farms, Inc.

Russell Pierson (December 15, 1911 – March 31, 2015) was a farm broadcasting pioneer and nationally recognized figure for his work in agriculture. Pierson was the Farm Director for WKY-TV and WKY for over twenty years as well as the owner of Pierson Seed Farms, Inc.

== Early life ==
Born on a farm 3 miles north of Mangum, OK down in Greer County. Pierson started school when he was 4 years old, and was then held back a year so that he could be with his cousins. Pierson attended a little one-room country school and stayed in the Mangum school district until he left to attend Oklahoma A&M in Stillwater, OK. In high school, Pierson was very involved in sports. He played left end as well and defensive halfback. He was also on the track team as a distance runner, which he considered his main sport. Pierson was also involved with 4-H in high school; his specialty was cotton.

Pierson enrolled at Oklahoma A&M (Oklahoma State University) in September 1929 with the intention of becoming an athletic coach. After a few weeks he switched over to agriculture. Pierson did not often return home for a visit because their main mode of travel was hitchhiking. It could take well over a day to get from Stillwater to Mangum.

To continue his running career, Pierson made the Oklahoma State cross country team as well as the track team as a distance runner. He competed in varsity events and won the “Loving Cup,” or first place, in the Tulsa Run. Pierson was also involved with the crop judging team and the Aggie Society where he eventually became the vice-president.

Pierson met his would-be-wife, Bernice Strom, when he and some other students elected her for “Aggie Princess.” Bernice was honored with the title in 1933 and the two began to date soon after. They dated for three years and married in 1936. A year into their marriage, their first daughter LaNese was born. Six years later, their second daughter Patricia was born. Pierson was the first of his family to graduate from college in 1937.

== Career ==
The first job Pierson had was as an assistant county agent for $135 a month. He worked with Uncle Tom Marks, the oldest county agent in Oklahoma. After working in this position for two years, Pierson became the county extension agent of Garvin County, Oklahoma and worked there for 11 years. During seven of those years, his teams won the state championship in crop judging and had several grand champion titles in the livestock exhibition.

Pierson was offered the head of the Oklahoma Crop Improvement Association and served in that position for seven years. At the time, the main crop Pierson worked with was wheat, but he also worked with alfalfa, grain sorghums, and watermelons. Pierson and his department were responsible for the entire state of Oklahoma. In 1953, Pierson established Pierson Seed Company and through contract production became the nation's largest producer of certified okra seed. After his time in the commercial seed business, Pierson’s career took quite a different path.

== Broadcasting career ==
After working as the director of the marketing division of the state board of agriculture, Pierson’s alma mater Oklahoma A & M contacted him with an offer to take over the farm broadcasting for WKY Radio and Television. In 1959, Pierson accepted the position with the Oklahoma Publishing Company owned station WKY. For every broadcast, Pierson closed the program with a rhyme. Every broadcast for over twenty years had a different poem that he came up with himself.

Pierson’s broadcast would start out with a market report, letting the audience know what the prices were and what goods were selling. Each day they would have a “phoned-in” report from one of the markets in the state, including Oklahoma City, Ringling, Enid, Pawhuska, Chickasha, etc. Next in his thirty-minute program, Pierson would report on agricultural news of national importance as well as news from within the state.

Pierson retired from broadcasting in 1983.

== Retirement ==
After retiring from WKY, Pierson spent a lot of time at the fairground, first with his own business, and then as supervisor of the feed and bedding services. Pierson worked in this capacity as a state fair consultant since 1983. Pierson also remained an active alumni at Oklahoma state university, and kept in touch with the agriculture department.

Pierson’s wife, Bernice, died in 2002. They were married for 67 years before she died. His oldest daughter, LaNese, died in 2013. Pierson died on March 31, 2015, at 103 years.

Keeping in tradition with the poetic sign-offs in his broadcasting career, Pierson left a final poem to be read at the end of his life.

Never let a single day go by
Without a kind gesture or an act.
And always tell those that you love,
Your affection for them is fact.
For our time on this earth is short,
Compared to what lay ahead.
And with Christ accompanying our journey,
That next step is absent dread.
So to all I leave behind,
And friendships I've held dear.
May Peace be with you until we meet again,
And may your days be filled with cheer.

== Awards and achievements ==
Pierson lived a long life full of achievement. Some of the numerous awards he received include:

- Top Radio and Television Farm Broadcaster in the United States (1972)
- Oklahoma Sirloin Club Honoree (1985)
- Oklahoma's Premier Certified Seed Producer (1999)
- Honorary Doctorate and Distinguished Alumnus award from Oklahoma State University (1998)
- Oklahoma State University Alumni Association Hall of Fame inductee (1988)
- Oklahoma Association of Conservation Districts Hall of Fame inductee (1989)
- National Association of Farm Broadcasters Hall of Fame inductee (1992)
