= WFIZ =

Radio station in Odessa, New York

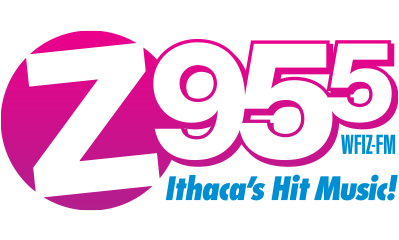
- Odessa, New York; United States
- Broadcast area: Ithaca–Cortland, New York
- Frequency: 95.5 MHz (HD Radio)
- Branding: Z95.5

Programming
- Format: Top 40 (CHR)
- Subchannels: HD2: Classic hits "Rewind 107.7"; HD3: WHCU simulcast
- Affiliations: Premiere Networks; Westwood One

Ownership
- Owner: Saga Communications; (Saga Communications of New England, LLC)
- Sister stations: WHCU, WIII, WNYY, WQNY, WYXL

History
- First air date: 1968 (as WFLR-FM at 95.9)
- Former call signs: WFLR-FM (1968–2008)
- Former frequencies: 95.9 MHz (1968–2008)

Technical information
- Licensing authority: FCC
- Facility ID: 36406
- Class: A
- ERP: 850 watts
- HAAT: 265 meters (869 ft)
- Transmitter coordinates: 42°23′13″N 76°40′11″W
- Translators: 94.9 W235BR (Ithaca); HD2: 107.7 W299BI (Ithaca)

Links
- Public license information: Public file; LMS
- Webcast: Listen Live; Listen Live (HD2)
- Website: z955.com rewind1077.com (HD2)

WFIZ (95.5 FM) is a radio station broadcasting a top 40 (CHR) format. Licensed to Odessa, New York, United States, the station serves the Ithaca area. The station is owned by Saga Communications, under Cayuga Radio Group.

== History ==
The station signed on in 1968 as "WFLR-FM" and had been broadcasting a country music format on 95.9 FM in Dundee, New York as "Country 95.9". On September 15, 2008, the station was moved to the current 95.5 FM frequency in Odessa, New York (Ithaca market) with a Top 40 format as "Z95-5".

In February 2014, Saga Communications completed their purchase of WFIZ-FM, along with its HD2 frequency. In August of that year, the broadcast studio was moved from its original location on Danby Road in Ithaca to join the other studios already owned by the company.
