= WQNY =

Radio station in Ithaca, New York

- Ithaca, New York; United States
- Frequency: 103.7 MHz (HD Radio)
- Branding: Q Country 103.7

Programming
- Format: Country
- Subchannels: HD2: WFIZ simulcast (Top 40 (CHR)); HD3: Alternative rock "Alt 95.9"
- Affiliations: Premiere Networks; Westwood One

Ownership
- Owner: Saga Communications; (Saga Communications of New England, LLC)
- Sister stations: WNYY, WHCU, WFIZ, WIII, WYXL

History
- First air date: June 6, 1948 (as WVFC)
- Former call signs: WVFC (1948–1953); WRRA (1953–1960); WEIV (1960–1982)
- Call sign meaning: Q Country New York

Technical information
- Licensing authority: FCC
- Facility ID: 32390
- Class: B
- ERP: 16,500 watts
- HAAT: 263 meters
- Transmitter coordinates: 42°23′13″N 76°40′10″W
- Translators: HD3: 95.9 W240CB (Ithaca); 103.3 W277BS (Ithaca)

Links
- Public license information: Public file; LMS
- Webcast: Listen Live
- Website: 1037qcountry.com alt959.com (HD3)

WQNY (103.7 FM) is a radio station broadcasting a country music format. Licensed to Ithaca, New York, United States, the station serves that market and occasionally has appeared in the Elmira–Corning ratings, as the station can be heard well in the eastern and northeastern parts of that market. The station is owned Saga Communications, and operates as part of its Cayuga Radio Group.

== History ==
WQNY was the flagship station of the Rural Radio Network (having replaced the station now known as WYXL) and signed on June 6, 1948, as WVFC. WVFC (later WRRA and then WEIV) served as flagship of the network from 1948 to 1981, when the network split up. On December 21, 1982, the station changed its call sign to the current WQNY.

Q-Country 103.7 is currently formatted as a country station, with local personalities either live or voicetracking from 6 am to 7 pm weekdays and most of the weekend daytime hours also. Prior to Saga ownership, WQNY was once an AOR and adult contemporary (in the late 1980s) type station known as Q104 or Q104FM "Ithaca's Continuous Music Station" also "The best of the ’60s, ’70s and Today" as of 1986.

In March 2010, WQNY began carrying its AM sister stations on its HD subchannels. WNYY now occupies the 103.7-HD2 channel, while WHCU occupies 103.7-HD3. The HD carriage enables the AM stations to overcome smaller, directional patterns used during nighttime hours.

In August 2010, translator W240CB 95.9 FM signed on the air and was assigned to relay WQNY. Saga uses the translator to relay the WQNY HD3 feed, WHCU.

On August 30, 2018, WQNY-HD3 dropped its simulcast with WHCU and began stunting with a loop of songs by Ithaca-based X Ambassadors. The station revealed its permanent format, alternative rock, on September 4, 2018.

WQNY is the most popular station in the Ithaca market, according to Arbitron ratings, and is thus the most commercially successful of the former Rural Radio Network stations.
