= Chuck Dunaway =

American radio personality (1934–2022)

- Born: Charles Ray Dunaway; December 1, 1934; Houston, Texas, U.S.
- Died: February 19, 2022 (aged 87); Katy, Texas, U.S.
- Occupations: Disc Jockey, programmer, business, radio station owner
- Spouse: Kendall
- Presenting career
- Stations: KILT (AM); KLIF (AM); WIXY; WKY; WABC (AM) (FM)
- Country: United States

Charles Ray Dunaway (December 1, 1934 – February 19, 2022) was an American radio personality and owner known for his work with a number of popular radio stations in Texas, Ohio, Oklahoma and New York City. Dunaway occupied the afternoon drive slot at every radio station he worked at during his 35-year career, including radio KILT-AM in Houston, KLIF-AM in Dallas, WKY in Oklahoma City, WABC (AM) in New York City and WIXY in Cleveland. He finished his career as the owner and operator of six FM and two AM radio stations in Joplin, Missouri.

== Background ==
Growing up in Houston, Dunaway's interest in radio grew while listening to the popular DJ Paul Berlin on his favorite pop music radio station KNUZ. His first “on air” job was when Dunaway was still in his senior year at Stephen F. Austin High School where he was heard every Saturday morning with the Morales Sisters on KLVL in Houston. It was the station's only English speaking hour on the Spanish formatted outlet owned by the Morales family. In 1952, after graduating from high school, Dunaway obtained his first full-time on-air radio job at KBST in Big Spring, Texas, at the rate of 65 cents an hour, where he remained for one year before joining KPRC in Houston as a staff announcer in 1953.

== Early career ==
After a brief time in Galveston and Freeport, Dunaway returned to Houston and his hometown favorite station KNUZ as a DJ. But as his strengths as on-air personality began to flourish, it was not long before he was offered the highly coveted afternoon drive slot on WKY in Oklahoma City. While working there, Dunaway became a featured character on the popular children's show, Foreman Scotty’s Circle 4 Ranch, on WKY-TV channel 4. But it was Dunaway's afternoon radio show with its 72.9% audience share—a rating never previously achieved in the market—that brought WABC (AM)'s program director, Mike Joseph, to Oklahoma City to offer Dunaway the afternoon drive shift at New York City's number one station. Dunaway eventually became disillusioned with the station's broad play list and after a year and a half decided to return briefly to his old job at WKY in Oklahoma City.

== Station wars ==
In the early nineteen-sixties, Dunaway was asked to take over the programming duties at KBOX in Dallas, but soon after the station's number one competitor, KLIF-AM, enticed him to work for the legendary Gordon McLendon at KLIF-AM doing afternoon drive. In 1964, McLendon transferred Dunaway to Houston for the afternoon drive shift at KILT-AM Following KILT, Dunaway joined WKYC, an NBC-owned and operated station in Cleveland, Ohio, for afternoon drive. In early 1969, when NBC decided to change the “top 40” rocker to a softer music format, Dunaway moved to WKYC's number one rival, WIXY Cleveland where he was both program director and afternoon drive personality. After a few brief stops in Austin at KHFI and KLBJ, Dunaway secured his first job as a radio station manager.

== Off air ==
In 1982, Dunaway married his third wife, Kendall, who became his partner in rebuilding several failing radio stations which they bought for a percentage of the appreciated value. Through this process, termed a turnaround, the Dunaways managed to turn five stations into successful operations which enabled them to save enough of the profits to become the owners. While Chuck ran the sales and programming departments, Kendall managed traffic, billing and the office staff. With other investors, the first property purchased was a Class C FM with a 5,000 watt AM, Big Mack Broadcasting. After only three years, enough was achieved to buy two main competitors and Big Mack then owned a cluster of six radio stations in the Joplin, Missouri, market. With the advent of consolidation, the Dunaways sold their stations in 1998 and returned to Houston.

== Death ==
Dunaway died in Katy, Texas on February 19, 2022, at the age of 87.

== Award and industry recognition ==
Dunaway was inducted into the Texas Radio Hall of Fame, once for DJ work (2003) and again for programming (2004). The Radio/Television Hall of fame in Ohio (2002)
