= WHCU =

Radio station in Ithaca, New York

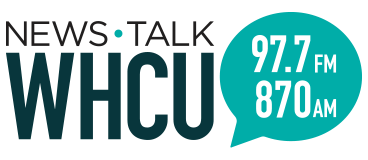
- Ithaca, New York; United States
- Broadcast area: Central New York
- Frequency: 870 kHz
- Branding: News-Talk 97.7 & 870

Programming
- Format: Talk radio
- Affiliations: ABC News Radio; NBC News Radio; Compass Media Networks; Premiere Networks; Westwood One; Cornell Big Red Sports

Ownership
- Owner: Saga Communications; (Saga Communications of New England, LLC)
- Sister stations: WFIZ, WIII, WNYY, WQNY, WYXL

History
- First air date: May 27, 1922
- Former call signs: 8YC, 8XT, 8XU, WU6 (1915–1922); WEAI (1922–1932); WESG (1932–1940)
- Call sign meaning: "Home of Cornell University" (original owner)

Technical information
- Licensing authority: FCC
- Facility ID: 18048
- Class: B
- Power: 5,000 watts (day); 1,000 watts (night)
- Transmitter coordinates: 42°27′54″N 76°22′23″W (day); 42°21′47″N 76°36′22″W (night)
- Translator: 97.7 W249DW (Ithaca)
- Repeater: 95.5 WFIZ-HD3 (Odessa)

Links
- Public license information: Public file; LMS
- Webcast: Listen live
- Website: whcuradio.com

WHCU (870 AM) is a commercial radio station licensed to Ithaca, New York, United States, that programs a talk format. Currently owned by Saga Communications, it is one of the oldest stations in Central New York and originally was an extension of Cornell University. WHCU's studios are located on Hanshaw Road in Ithaca.

By day, WHCU is powered at 5,000 watts non-directional. At night, to protect other stations on 870 AM, a clear channel frequency, WHCU reduces power to 1,000 watts using a directional antenna. The station's daytime transmitter is off Mount Pleasant Road in Etna, while its nighttime three-tower array is off Protts Hill Road in Newfield Hamlet. Programming is simulcast on 175-watt FM translator W249DW at 97.7 MHz.

== History ==
=== Experimental years ===
What is now WHCU was first licensed on May 27, 1922, to Cornell University in Ithaca. However, by this time the school already had extensive experience with radio communication in its earliest stages. The school reportedly began experimenting with a spark transmitter for Morse code in 1906. It began radiotelephone work in 1910.

In mid-1915, the university was issued a license to operate a "Technical and Training School" station, 8YC. A year later, it was issued an Experimental station license with the call sign 8XT. A later report states that the Experimental station's call sign was 8XU.

Beginning in April 1917, due to the start of U.S. involvement in World War I, most civilian stations had to suspend operations. However Cornell was issued a special permit by the War Department to operate a station in conjunction with a campus military unit. After the end of the war, in late 1919 the university was authorized to operate a "War Department Training and Rehabilitation School" station, WU6. That was followed early the next year by the reactivation of Experimental station 8XU.

=== WEAI ===
Effective December 1, 1921, the Department of Commerce, which regulated radio communication at this time, adopted regulations to formally establish a broadcast service category, which set aside the wavelength of 360 meters (833 kHz) for "entertainment" broadcasting, and 485 meters (619 kHz) for "market and weather reports". On May 27, 1922, Cornell University was issued a broadcasting station license with the sequentially assigned call letters WEAI, for operation on 360 meters.

The station was used as a vehicle for promoting the university's extension service and all of its programming was educational in nature.

=== WESG ===
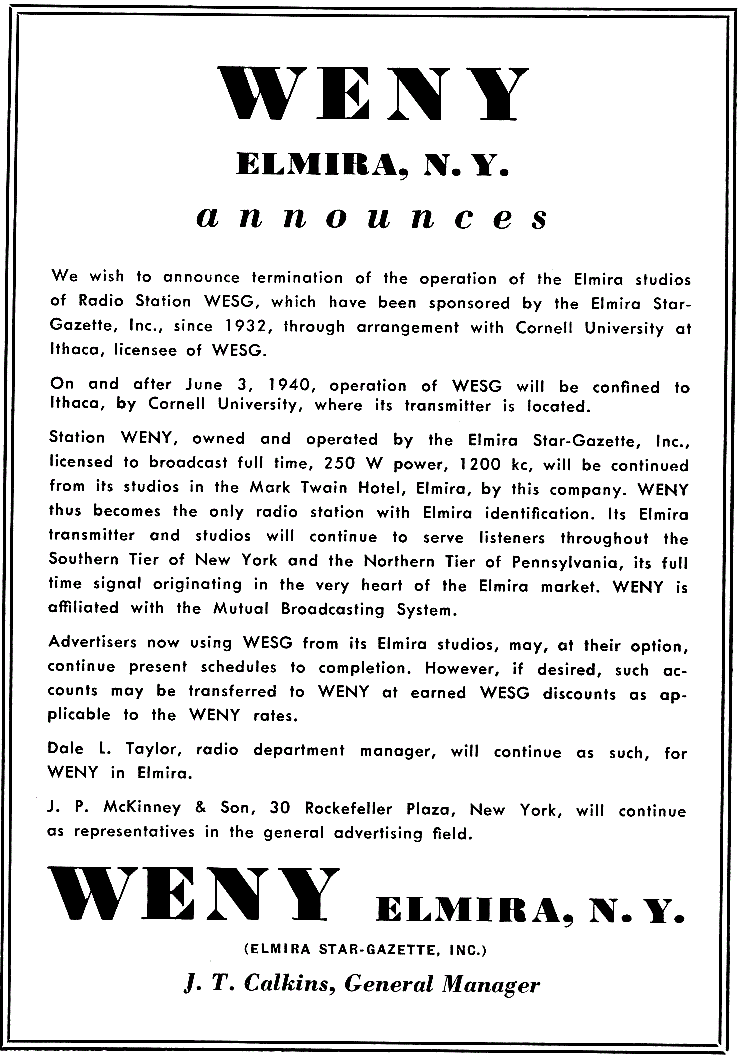
In May 1940 the Star-Gazette advertised that it had established its own station, WENY in Elmira, and was ending its eight-year lease of WESG. In July WESG's call sign was changed to the current WHCU.

Cornell only had the resources to broadcast for a few hours per day. In 1932, an arrangement was made with the Elmira Star-Gazette to lease unused hours to the newspaper. The station's main studio location was changed to the Mark Twain Hotel in Elmira, however Cornell continued to be the station's licensee, and the transmitter remained in Ithaca. Reflecting the newspaper's now dominant role in operating the station, WEAI's call sign was changed to WESG, and the newspaper made its debut broadcast October 2.

In late 1939 the Star-Gazette established its own station, WENY in Elmira. Although the newspaper had previously made an agreement to lease WESG through 1943, as of June 3, 1940, it terminated the lease and ended its association with WESG.

=== WHCU ===
The FCC ordered Cornell to run the station itself or surrender the license. Within 12 hours of the deadline, the station signed on with borrowed staff and equipment. On July 8, 1940, WESG's call letters were changed to WHCU, which stood for "Home of Cornell University". WHCU's first complete studios and offices were completed in 1941. New studios were built in downtown Ithaca in 1957.

Cornell University sold WHCU and its sister station WYXL to Eagle Communications in 1985. Six years later, the stations moved into a new complex on Hanshaw Road in the town of Dryden, northeast of Ithaca.

=== Saga Communications ===
WHCU and its sister stations WYXL, WQNY and WNYY were purchased by Saga Communications in 2005, under the name Cayuga Radio Group.

In March 2010, WHCU returned to the FM airwaves when its sister station WQNY launched News/Talk 870 on its HD3 channel. WHCU had been on a former WYXL translator (first at 95.5, then briefly at 95.9) before Saga turned off the translator, accommodating the introduction of WFIZ into the market. The use of WQNY-HD3 overcomes the challenges of 870's night time pattern, especially outside of Tompkins County.

In August 2010, WHCU returned to analog FM broadcasting with the reintroduction of a translator at 95.9 FM. W240CB is a 250-watt translator located on Ithaca's South Hill, and it is licensed to rebroadcast WQNY. As with Hits 103.3 and 98.7 the Vine, the company uses the translator to rebroadcast the aforementioned HD3 signal.

WHCU had a three-and-a-half-hour local news and interview based morning show each weekday called the Morning Newswatch. On April 18, 2018, this program was canceled. On July 13, 2020, Ithaca's Morning News and Ithaca's Evening News were launched.

On August 30, 2018, WHCU switched its translator from W240CB 95.9 (and WQNY-HD3, which began stunting towards a new format at this time) to W249DW 97.7.

== Programming ==
Since 2005, WHCU has had a conservative talk format. Joe Salzone hosts the station's local morning show, with syndicated programming airing for the balance of the day. WHCU is also the flagship of Cornell University Big Red football, hockey and men's lacrosse broadcasts.

== Award ==
WHCU won a 1946 Special Citation of Honor Peabody Award for its program, "Radio Edition of the Weekly Press."

== See also ==
- List of initial AM-band station grants in the United States
