= WKY =

Sports radio station in Oklahoma City

- Oklahoma City, Oklahoma; United States
- Broadcast area: Oklahoma City Metroplex
- Frequency: 930 kHz
- Branding: The Sports Animal

Programming
- Language: English
- Format: Sports radio
- Affiliations: Westwood One Sports; Oklahoma City Thunder

Ownership
- Owner: Cumulus Media; (Radio License Holding CBC, LLC)
- Sister stations: KATT-FM; KKWD; KWPN; KYIS; WWLS-FM

History
- Founded: January 20, 1920
- First air date: March 16, 1922
- Former call signs: 5XT (1921–1922)

Technical information
- Licensing authority: FCC
- Facility ID: 23418
- Class: B
- Power: 5,000 watts (day); 510 watts (night)
- Transmitter coordinates: 35°33′43.2″N 97°30′25.1″W

Links
- Public license information: Public file; LMS
- Webcast: Listen live
- Website: www.wky930am.com

WKY (930 AM) is a commercial radio station in Oklahoma City, Oklahoma, owned by Cumulus Media. It was the first, therefore is the oldest, broadcasting station in Oklahoma, and among the oldest in the nation. WKY airs a sports radio format. The station's studios and offices are in northwest Oklahoma City.

WKY's transmitter and its single tower are located on NE 91st Street in Oklahoma City. WKY is powered at 5,000 watts by day, using a 961-foot (293 m) non-directional antenna that is the tallest AM radio tower in the United States. It once broadcast at night with a 5,000-watt directional signal, using a multiple tower array. Ownership decided to switch to non-directional nighttime operation, which allows WKY to need only one antenna, but required the station to drop to 510 watts at night.

== History ==
=== Early years ===
Although Federal Communications Commission (FCC) records list WKY's "date first licensed" as March 16, 1922, station histories have generally traced its founding to earlier activities, beginning as early as January 1920 according to WKY co-founder Earl Clement Hull.

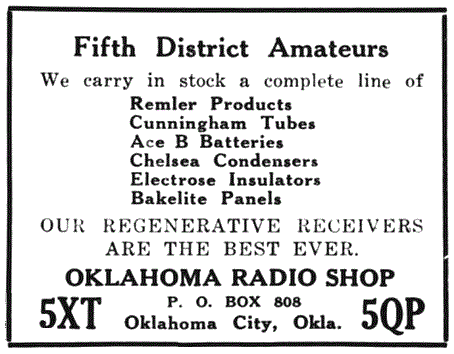
November 1921 advertisement for the Oklahoma Radio Shop, which references amateur radio station 5QP and experimental station 5XT.

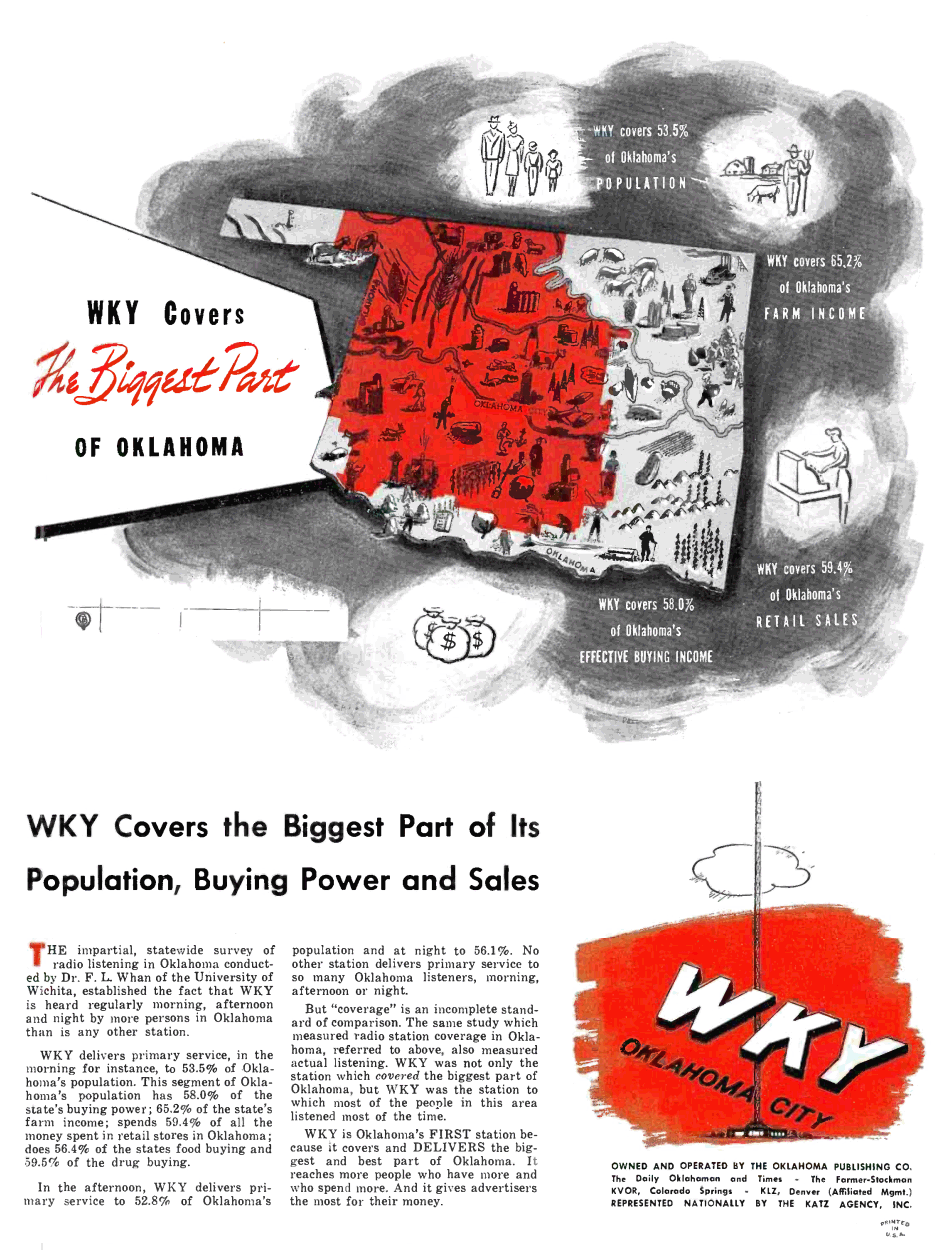
April 1945 station advertisement.

After the end of World War I, Hull was posted at Fort Sill in Oklahoma, where he taught radio communication classes. Using a supply of scarce vacuum tubes he described as being "borrowed" from the Signal Corps, he constructed a radio transmitter that was operated from his home at 1911 Ash Street in Oklahoma City. In June 1921, Hull was issued a license for amateur station 5QP, located at his residence.

In the spring of 1921, Hull founded the Oklahoma Radio Shop, initially located at Hull's home, as a partnership with Sherwood Richards. In the fall of 1921, the Oklahoma Radio Shop was issued a license for an experimental station, 5XT.

Eventually the Daily Oklahoman newspaper teamed up with the Oklahoma Radio Company to provide a daily series of broadcasts, from 8:00 to 9:00 pm, beginning on March 5, 1922. A March 8 broadcast of Alma Gluck singing at the First Christian Church was described by the newspaper as its "first big broadcast", although the microphone had to be hidden behind a curtain, because the singer had refused to consent to making the broadcast.

Beginning in late 1912, radio communication in the United States was regulated by the Department of Commerce. Initially there were no formal standards for which stations could make broadcasts intended for the general public, and after World War I stations under a variety of license classes, most commonly Amateur and Experimental, began making regularly scheduled programs on a limited basis. To provide common standards for the service, the Commerce Department issued a regulation effective December 1, 1921, that stated that broadcasting stations would now have to hold a Limited Commercial license that authorized operation on two designated broadcasting wavelengths: 360 meters (833 kHz) for "entertainment", and 485 meters (619 kHz) for "market and weather reports". WKY's first license, as Oklahoma's first broadcasting station, was issued on March 16, 1922, to the Oklahoma Radio Shop in Oklahoma City, for operation on both wavelengths.

The WKY call sign was randomly assigned from a list of available call letters. Currently most stations west of the Mississippi River have call letters beginning with "K". However, WKY was licensed before the government changed the dividing line between W and K call signs. Prior to the January 1923 establishment of the Mississippi River as the boundary, call letters beginning with "W" were generally assigned to stations east of an irregular line formed by the western state borders from North Dakota south to Texas, with calls beginning with "K" going only to stations in states west of that line.

In November 1922, WKY announced a "silent night" policy, meaning the station would broadcast only four, and later three nights a week. This was so listeners could have a chance to tune into other stations in neighboring states.

Richards and Hull struggled to keep WKY on the air. In late 1925, Richards left the radio business, but Hull continued to keep WKY going by selling shares of the station to radio dealers in Oklahoma City. The dealers paid Hull a small fee to keep the station broadcasting, but over time, they decided the financial drain had become too much. In 1928, WKY was purchased by the Oklahoma Publishing Company, which also owned the Daily Oklahoman newspaper. The price was $5,000 (about $75,000 today).

The formal opening of the new WKY was set for November 11, 1928, but the station went on the air several days earlier to carry the presidential election returns as Herbert Hoover won in a Republican landslide.

That December, the station became an NBC Red Network affiliate and began carrying the network's programs. During the "Golden Age of Radio" that included dramas, comedies, news, sports, soap operas, game shows and big band broadcasts. By the following year, WKY was attempting to operate like the powerhouse stations in the East. Aside from NBC network shows, everything broadcast by WKY originated locally.

WKY operated from the Skirvin Hotel in downtown Oklahoma City from 1936 to 1951, and was contracted to broadcast live from the Venetian Room from 11:00 to midnight every evening. The opening night performance cost $15 a couple for dinner and dancing.

From November 1941, through June 1942, WKY broadcast its own original supernatural thriller series called Dark Fantasy. All 31 episodes can still be heard today.

=== WKY-FM and -TV ===
WKY-FM was launched on July 1, 1947, at 98.9 MHz, programming mostly classical music. An effort was made to minimize duplication of WKY AM programs and make WKY-FM a true second station. In 1949, a TV station, WKY-TV (now KFOR-TV) was added, as the first television outlet in Oklahoma.

Few people owned FM radios in the early 1950s. By 1952, WKY management had to make a decision about keeping the FM station on the air or increasing the power of the company's new television tower. Since WKY-FM was not showing a profit, it lost out. The station shut down, and its transmitter and associated equipment were donated to the Oklahoma City Public School District. The discontinuation received only one letter of protest, from a music lover in Norman, Oklahoma. In 1969 the vacated 98.9 MHz frequency was assigned to a new station, KBYE-FM, which is now sister station KYIS.

=== Top 40 years ===
WKY has featured many formats over the years, including Contemporary Hits, Oldies, Country music, Adult Contemporary, Easy Listening, Christian talk and teaching, Talk, Hot Talk, Sports and Regional Mexican as a simulcast of then-sister station KINB.

In 1958, WKY became the second Top 40 station in Oklahoma City after KOCY (now KGHM). During the 1960s and 1970s, WKY fended off serious challenges from 50,000 watt rival KOMA. Although KOMA was very famous outside Oklahoma City, due to its large nighttime signal, WKY was usually the ratings leader in the city itself. WKY continued to top many Arbitron ratings sweeps into the 1970s, even as young people began seeking hit music from the FM dial. WKY's top disc jockeys during that time, Danny Williams, Ronnie Kaye and Fred Hendrickson, later became "KOMA Good Guys" when KOMA flipped from adult standards to oldies.

=== Country music ===
WKY changed its format to country music on May 25, 1984, shortly after station owner Edward Gaylord purchased Nashville radio powerhouse WSM and the Grand Ole Opry. WKY simulcasted live Grand Ole Opry broadcasts from WSM for a short time.

=== Easy listening ===
WKY dropped its country format to become an easy listening station on June 30, 1990, shortly after longtime FM easy listening station KKNG moved to soft adult contemporary music. Bus benches throughout Oklahoma City had the purple and white logo declaring "Easy Listening is back, 930 WKY".

Although it took a bit of time to grow the format, within a year, WKY had beaten KKNG in the ratings. As a result, KKNG shifted to Mainstream AC and rebranded as "Mix 92.5", which barely lasted a year.

WKY's taking stewardship of the easy listening format ended up helping former rival KOMA, as its oldies format took over the 92.5 frequency in the summer of 1992. Despite getting high ratings, WKY had trouble getting advertisers to buy in.

=== Talk radio ===
WKY switched to a talk radio format in 1994. In the process of flipping, it hired back many of the news staff it let go when it became an easy listening station in 1990.

The station stumbled out of the starting gate and struggled to compete against Clear Channel Communications' KTOK. KTOK already had the top names in syndicated conservative talk on its schedule, including Rush Limbaugh and Sean Hannity. Often, WKY had to choose lesser national talk hosts to compete with KTOK for ratings. In its first year, WKY failed to cover its operational costs. In 1995, OPUBCO turned over operation of WKY to Clear Channel, who operated the station through a local marketing agreement (LMA) after several continued months of operating in the red.

Finally, in 2002, OPUBCO sold the station to Citadel Broadcasting after 74 years of ownership. WKY, along with WSM-AM-FM in Nashville, had been the last vestiges of the once-vast Gaylord broadcasting empire, which at its height included eight radio stations and seven television stations.

From 1994 to 2002, WKY was a talk station. It flirted with an all-sports format, with two local sports talk shows in the drive time periods. "SuperTalk 930 WKY" was launched in March 2003. The format featured local-oriented talk shows throughout the day with some syndicated talk during the evening and weekend.

=== WKY en español ===
"SuperTalk" ended on January 9, 2006. In an effort to target Oklahoma City's growing Hispanic population, WKY began airing a simulcast of KINB. Because KINB was divested as part of the Citadel–ABC Radio merger, the simulcast on WKY was dropped June 12, 2007, and the station began stunting for several days.

On June 20, 2007, at 9:01 am, Oklahoma City Mayor Mick Cornett, a former sports, and later news anchor on KOCO-TV, signaled the start of "JOX 930 WKY". It was the fifth station in the market with a sports radio format.

After struggling in the ratings, WKY announced on December 22, 2008, that it would change formats from sports programming. On January 7, 2009, WKY flipped back to "La Indomable".

=== Sale to Cumulus ===
On March 10, 2011, Cumulus Media announced that it would purchase Citadel Broadcasting. After receiving conditional regulatory approval from the Department of Justice and the FCC, the deal was approved by Citadel shareholders on September 15, 2011. The merger of the two companies closed on September 16, 2011, and Citadel became an indirect wholly owned subsidiary of Cumulus Media.

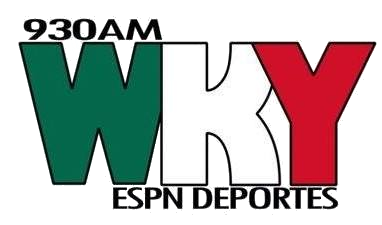
Logo as an ESPN Deportes Radio affiliate

From February 2017 to September 8, 2019, WKY was a full-time affiliate of ESPN Deportes Radio, offering all sports programming in Spanish. After that network ended operations, WKY returned to sports in English, simulcasting sister station WWLS-FM. WKY was the home of Bishop McGuinness Catholic High School Football for several seasons.

On September 1, 2026, WKY split from its simulcast with WWLS-FM and is carrying Westwood One Sports programming.

== Notable alumni ==
- Phil Boyce, Program Director, Salem Communications.
- CBS Evening News anchor Walter Cronkite (1916–2009) served as play-by-play commentator for University of Oklahoma football games during the 1937 season.
- TV Show host Mike Douglas (1926–2006) started his career as a staff singer on WKY before joining the Navy during World War II and serving on a munitions ship.
- Chuck Dunaway, Houston native who worked his way to Oklahoma City and eventually landed in New York at WABC 770. He had two stints at WKY and went on to own radio stations in Lexington, Kentucky, and Joplin, Missouri.
- Syndicated disc jockey Steve Goddard.
- Ernest Istook, a former Republican member of the United States House of Representatives for the 5th District of Oklahoma. Istook was a member of the Appropriations and the Homeland Security committees. He was the Republican gubernatorial nominee in 2006, running against incumbent Democrat Gov. Brad Henry. Istook lost the gubernatorial race. During the 1970s, Istook worked as a radio news reporter at WKY. Istook also worked at KOMA.
- Ronnie Kaye was heard on WKY from 1961 to 1980. From 1966 to 1974 he hosted "The Scene", a dance program on WKY-Channel 4 (now KFOR).
- Frank McGee (1921–1974) Co-Anchor, NBC Nightly News, NBC's Today Show.
- Kevin Metheny (1954–2014) using the name "Kevin Michaels" during his 1971 stint at WKY, was portrayed by Paul Giamatti under the name Kenny "Pig Vomit" Rushton in the movie Private Parts, starring Howard Stern. Metheny was the program director at WNBC-AM 660 in New York City during the early 1980s. He went on to work at MTV as Vice President for Production and Programming. At the time of his death, Metheny was Program Director for Cumulus Media in San Francisco.
- Jack Mildren (1949–2008) All-American Quarterback at the University of Oklahoma from 1969 to 1971. During that time, he earned the title of "Godfather of the Wishbone". Mildren played in the NFL from 1972 through 1974 for the Baltimore Colts and the New England Patriots. In 1990, Mildren became the 22nd Lieutenant Governor of Oklahoma. In 1994, he ran unsuccessfully as a Democratic candidate for Governor of Oklahoma, losing to Republican Frank Keating. In addition to his drive-time show on WKY, Mildren was also a regular contributor on sister station WWLS.
- Jimmy O'Neill (1940–2013) Host of ABC's Shindig! TV program from 1964 to 1966; longtime DJ in Los Angeles.
- Russell Pierson (1911–2015) farm broadcaster from 1959 to 1983, known for closing every program with a rhyme.
- Danny Williams (1927–2013) Program Director during WKY's years as a Top 40 station. Williams began the Oklahoma portion of his career in 1950, and would stay at WKY until his first "retirement" in 1979. At the age of 81, he retired from 92.5 KOMA-FM on August 29, 2008, after spending 16 years as the morning drive personality.

== See also ==
- List of initial AM-band station grants in the United States
- List of three-letter broadcast call signs in the United States
