= WYXL =

Radio station in Ithaca, New York

Coordinates: 42.465°N 76.373°W

- Ithaca, New York; United States
- Broadcast area: Central New York
- Frequency: 97.3 MHz (HD Radio)
- Branding: Lite Rock 97.3

Programming
- Format: Adult contemporary
- Subchannels: HD2: AAA; HD3: Sports
- Affiliations: Compass Media Networks

Ownership
- Owner: Saga Communications; (Saga Communications of New England, LLC)
- Sister stations: WFIZ, WHCU, WIII, WNYY, WQNY

History
- First air date: 1948
- Former call signs: WYFC (1948–1951); WHCU-FM (1951–1987)
- Former frequencies: 95.1 MHz (1948–1950)

Technical information
- Licensing authority: FCC
- Facility ID: 18051
- Class: B
- ERP: 26,000 watts
- HAAT: 268 meters (879 ft)
- Translators: HD2: 96.7 W244CZ (Ithaca); HD3: 96.3 W242AB (Cayuga Heights)

Links
- Public license information: Public file; LMS
- Webcast: Listen live; Listen live (HD2)
- Website: literock973.com 967thevine.com (HD2); 963thebuzzer.com (HD3)

WYXL (97.3 FM) is a commercial radio station licensed to Ithaca, New York, United States, known as "Lite Rock 97.3." It broadcasts an adult contemporary format. The station has been owned by Saga Communications, operating as part of its Cayuga Radio Group, since 2005.

WYXL broadcasts in HD Radio: the HD2 digital subchannel carries an adult album alternative (AAA) format, feeding an FM translator at 96.7 MHz, while the HD3 subchannel carries a sports radio format, feeding an FM translator at 96.3 MHz.

== History ==
=== Rural Radio Network and Cornell University ===
The station signed on as WYFC in 1948. It originally broadcast at 95.1 MHz. It was a charter member of the Rural Radio Network. In 1951, it was obtained by Cornell University.

Cornell changed the call letters to WHCU-FM to match those of the AM station it already owned. Under Cornell, the station moved to its current frequency. The university built new studios for the stations in downtown Ithaca in 1957. The AM station carried a news, information and discussion format with hourly news from CBS Radio News while the FM station specialized in classical music. Both stations were commercial operations but were subsidized by Cornell.

=== Eagle and Saga Communications ===
Cornell University sold WHCU-AM-FM to Eagle Communications in 1985. Eagle switched WHCU-FM to adult contemporary music, changing the call sign to WYXL. The AM station became a more mainstream talk radio outlet. Six years later, the stations moved into a new complex on Hanshaw Road, northeast of Ithaca in the town of Dryden.

In 2005, WYXL was acquired by the Cayuga Radio Group, a subsidiary of Saga Communications.

=== HD Radio ===
WYXL is one of the first stations in the nation to rebroadcast its HD subchannels on its analog translators. Its HD-2 channel was originally a syndicated CHR/Top 40 service known as Hits 103.3, using the W277BS translator. Hits 103.3 signed on in September 2008, shortly after the debut of WFIZ "Z-95.5" FM. The 103.3 translator prior to HD service at WYXL had been an FM simulcast of WNYY.

Its HD-3 channel launched in September 2009 as "98.7 The Vine", a blend of AAA with lesser known independent artists and some local bands. It formerly broadcast on the W254BF translator, which was acquired from Clear Channel in 2009. The translator, formerly on 98.3 FM at much lower power, was used to rebroadcast WPHR-FM (106.9 FM) while it was located in Auburn. On February 17, 2014 WYXL-HD3 and W254BF changed their format to sports, branded as "98.7 The Buzzer", with programming from CBS Sports Radio.

On March 24, 2020, during the COVID-19 pandemic, Saga announced that WYXL-HD3 and the translator, which had since moved to 96.3 W242AB, would temporarily suspend regular sports programming between 8AM and 5PM Mondays through Fridays to carry information for patients being tested for the virus at the mobile testing facility at The Shops at Ithaca Mall. Sports programming, which had since shifted to Fox Sports Radio, continued during downtime hours and weekends.

WYXL previously had a translator on 95.5 FM that had simulcast WHCU, but the translator was shut off prior to the sign on of WFIZ.
