= WWLS-FM =

Radio station in The Village, Oklahoma

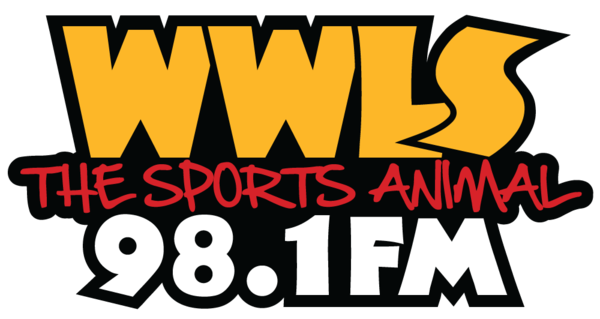
- The Village, Oklahoma; United States
- Broadcast area: Oklahoma City metropolitan area
- Frequency: 98.1 MHz
- Branding: The Sports Animal

Programming
- Format: Sports
- Affiliations: ESPN Radio; Oklahoma City Thunder

Ownership
- Owner: Cumulus Media; (Radio License Holding CBC, LLC)
- Sister stations: KATT-FM, KKWD, KYIS, WKY, KWPN

History
- First air date: June 28, 1962
- Former call signs: KWHP (1962–1978); KCFX (1978–1979); KKLR (1979–1988); KTNT-FM (1988–1999); KCYI (1999–2000); KKWD (2000–2006)
- Former frequencies: 97.7 MHz (1962–1999); 97.9 MHz (1999–2008)
- Call sign meaning: former owner Larry Steckline

Technical information
- Licensing authority: FCC
- Facility ID: 37435
- Class: C1
- ERP: 31,000 watts
- HAAT: 470 meters (1,540 ft)
- Transmitter coordinates: 35°33′37″N 97°29′7″W

Links
- Public license information: Public file; LMS
- Webcast: Listen live
- Website: www.thesportsanimal.com

WWLS-FM (98.1 MHz) is a commercial radio station licensed to The Village, Oklahoma, and serving the Oklahoma City metropolitan area. It is owned by Cumulus Media and airs a sports radio format, calling itself "The Sports Animal." Local hosts are heard weekday mornings, afternoons and evenings, as well as weekends. WWLS-FM is the flagship station for the Oklahoma City Thunder in the National Basketball Association.

The studios and offices are on NW 64th Street in Northwest Oklahoma City. The transmitter is on the Northeast side on Ridgeway Road off NE 78th Street.

Until September 2026, programming on WWLS-FM was simulcast on WKY in Oklahoma City. Many of the shows are also heard on "Sports Animal" stations in Tulsa (FM 99.9 and AM 1550), Muskogee (FM 97.1 and AM 1490), Elk City (1240 AM) and Woodward (AM 1450).

== History ==
=== Early years ===
On June 28, 1962, the station signed on as KWHP. The call letters came from the owner's name, William Haydon Payne. He also served as the station manager and chief engineer. KWHP broadcast on 97.7 MHz and the original city of license was Edmond, Oklahoma. The effective radiated power (ERP) was only 410 watts, a fraction of its current output. In 1964, the station moved to Kelly Street.

The station was put on the air in a small house on 1305 South Boulevard Street in Edmond. The radio station was in the owner's home, the transmitter in the bedroom and the studio in the garage. His wife threatened to leave unless the radio station was moved out of the house. In 1964, the station moved to Kelly Street. In 1978, call letters change to KCFX, representing the change to country and the station mascot "The Fox." In 1979, Payne sold the station. *PAYNE website

It later became KKLR and then KTNT. Porter Davis, whose family-owned Davis Foods distributors, bought the station, switching it to Smooth Jazz in 1993 as KTNT "97.7 The Trend".

Citadel Broadcasting purchased the station, along with "SportsRadio 640" WWLS and "Sports Talk 1340" KEBC, in 1998.

=== The City 97.9, and Wild 97dot9 (1999–2006) ===
In February 1999, the station changed its call letters to KCYI, moved to 97.9 FM, and became "The City 97.9", retaining the Smooth Jazz format.

On January 24, 2000, at noon, KCYI dropped its smooth jazz format and began stunting with a Microsoft robotic countdown (similar to Willow Pond's text-to-speech male voice), counting down until 6:45 a.m. on January 27. At that time, KCYI flipped to Rhythmic CHR as "Wild 97dot9." The first song on "Wild" was Wild Thing by Tone Lōc.

=== The Sports Animal (2006–present) ===
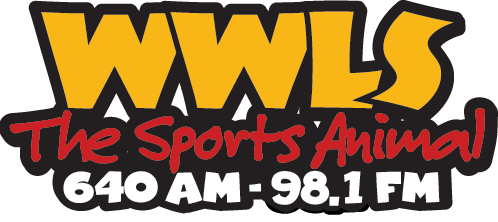
Former logo used between July 9, 2008, and April 2, 2012

On October 23, 2006, WWLS (then at 104.9 FM) switched signals with sister station KKWD and moved to the 97.9 frequency. On July 9, 2008, WWLS upgraded its signal to 31,000 watts ERP and moved from 97.9 to 98.1 FM.

In addition, WWLS is the hub for the "Sports Animal Network" that simulcasts selected programming on stations throughout Oklahoma including: 930 AM WKY in Oklahoma City, 1550 AM KYAL and 99.9 FM in Sapulpa and Tulsa, 97.1 FM KYAL-FM in Muskogee and Tulsa, 96.1 FM KITO-FM in Vinita, 101.1 FM KEOJ in Caney and Bartlesville, 1470 AM KGND in Vinita, 1240 AM KADS and 98.1 FM in Elk City, 1450 AM KSIW in Woodward, Oklahoma, and 1240 AM KVSO and 107.5 FM in Ardmore.

WWLS is also the radio home of Oklahoma City Thunder of the NBA, and the market's affiliate for ESPN Radio.

=== Unusual call letters ===
While nearly all radio and TV stations in Oklahoma have call signs beginning with at "K," WWLS-FM is linked to an AM station that dates from the earliest days of broadcasting, KWPN. That station signed on in 1922 as WNAD in Norman, Oklahoma, owned by the University of Oklahoma. At that time, Oklahoma was in "W" territory.

When WNAD switched call letters to WWLS, it got to keep its historic W call sign. To give WWLS an FM simulcast, 98.1 became WWLS-FM. That made WWLS-FM the only FM station in Oklahoma with a call sign starting with a W. When the owners decided to focus the local sports programming on the FM station and switch the AM station to mostly national ESPN Radio shows, the AM station's call sign flipped to KWPN, leaving WWLS-FM with its unique W call letters. Sister station WKY is the other station in the market with a "W" call sign.
