= Dark Fantasy (series) =

American radio supernatural thriller anthology series

Dark Fantasy was an American radio supernatural thriller anthology series. It had a short run of 31 episodes, debuting on November 14, 1941, and ending on June 19, 1942. Its writer was Scott Bishop, also known for his work on The Mysterious Traveler. It originated from station WKY in Oklahoma City and was heard Friday nights on NBC stations. The stories found a nationwide audience almost immediately.

== Episodes ==
Table of episodes of the Dark Fantasy radio series
No. overall	No. in season	Title	Original release date
1	1	"The Man Who Came Back"	November 14, 1941
Blake is murdered by his wife's lover, and comes back from the grave to avenge his death by haunting him after he gets away with a self-defence argument in court.
2	2	"Soul of Shan Hai Huan"	November 21, 1941
This episode is unavailable, so no true summary exists, but a teaser for this episode promised: The episode concerns the tombs of ancient China.
3	3	"The Thing from the Sea"	November 28, 1941
A newspaper reports on cinema star Philip Haywood vanishing from his private yacht, and set about explaining the events which also lead to his wife and father also disappearing.
4	4	"The Demon Tree"	December 5, 1941
A party of three people set about exploring a beautiful forest, which is rumoured to have an ancient oak that is believed to have strangled anybody who enters.
5	5	"Men Call Me Mad"	December 19, 1941
Scientist Charles Terhune discovers another world hidden inside a moonbeam, and devises a way to visit the world where he discovers his love, Emma, and a strange plague that is killing the people.
6	6	"The House of Bread"	December 26, 1941
Scott Bishop tells the story of a dream in which he is talking to an old man known as Word, who tells Scott he must seek out of the House of Bread.
7	7	"Resolution 1841"	January 2, 1942
Laura Cabot shares her story of New Year's Eve where she braves snow and wind with friends to attend a party being held by friends, and discovers in attendance an acquaintance from one hundred years prior.
8	8	"The Curse of the Neanderthal"	January 9, 1942
Artist Amanda Loveland takes a trip to Nanaw Canyon, where she is blocked in by a landslide. Still stuck as night approaches, she is guided out by the figure of her sister Grace.
9	9	"Debt from the Past"	January 16, 1942
In 1942, Mary Billings is desperate for work, and heads for a job interview as a stenographer. She discovers that the building takes her back in time, to 1912.
10	10	"The Headless Dead"	January 23, 1942
Frederick Holman visits the Tower of London, where he dismisses the idea of the chapel being haunted. Being left alone, he soon finds the flagstones lifting up from the floor.
11	11	"Death is a Savage Deity"	January 30, 1942
An unsympathetic Wanda is approached by her grieving niece Delores, who wants to talk about her friend Andrews who has committed suicide, which leads to her revealing her powers of perception.
12	12	"Sea Phantom"	February 6, 1942
A seaman finds an intruder in the captain's cabin, as well as the ships slate having been signed by captain Jonathan Strange, who died aboard The Sea Phantom at sea over two hundred years prior.
13	13	"W is for Werewolf"	February 13, 1942
Jim and Angela Howard are going on vacation, and visit a small island owned by old friend, Bill. However, they discover his son Jonny is acting odd, and that Bill has a number of books related to werewolves.
14	14	"A Delicate Case of Murder"	February 20, 1942
Laura Winstead conducts a séance, in the presence of her sceptical husband Harvey, and friend Federica. She discovers that the pair have been having an affair, and intends to prove her powers.
15	15	"Spawn of the Sub-Human"	February 27, 1942
A famous soprano takes a chartered flight with her partner and manager Michael. Feeling an impending sense of doom, the pair discover the plane is being piloted by an ape.
16	16	"Man with the Scarlet Satchel"	March 6, 1942
Nurse Rose Esther and attorney Sam Williard murder their client, a scientist named Peter Craig. His request to be buried with modelling clay has him returning from beyond the grave.
17	17	"Superstition Be Hanged"	March 13, 1942
Trapeze artist, Flyer Samsom, introduces a new trick though his recent history of failures, and a mystic predicting his death leads to him being hung by a twisted trapeze rope.
18	18	"Pennsylvania Turnpike"	March 20, 1942
At a gas station, hitch-hiker Mr. Miner, who is over two hundred years old, encounters a fellow traveller looking for Pine Knob. Offering to take him there, Mr. Miner and the traveller were fated to meet.
19	19	"Convoy for Atlantis"	March 27, 1942
A search ship investigates the disappearance of boats in the Atlantic Ocean, in which survivors were found in a drugged-like state. The boat encounters a man who offers to take them on a trip to the bottom of the ocean.
20	20	"The Thing from the Darkness"	April 3, 1942
A pilot is taking a customer across the desert to Mantella, but the plane is caught in a sandstorm and forced to land in Santia. However, they quickly discover that they are not welcome visitors.
21	21	"Edge of the Shadow"	April 10, 1942
Farm worker Hank pulls a gun on his boss Mr. Fuller. Planning to kill him and marry his wife, Hank and Mr. Fuller end up in a fight which leads to Hank having visions of a near future.
22	22	"Curare"	April 17, 1942
No summary due to this episode being unavailable.
23	23	"Screaming Skulls"	April 24, 1942
No summary due to this episode being unavailable.
24	24	"The Letter from Yesterday"	May 1, 1942
Adam Chase visits his small-town library, and discovers the librarian Cecily Marshall who he falls in love with. However, as the pair head towards marriage, Adam vanishes on a trip to Washington.
25	25	"The Cup of Gold"	May 8, 1942
A reporter investigates the death of new world golf champion Truman Davis, who is shot by a woman, Ruth Kendish. However she has no recollection of the events beyond a parcel containing incense.
26	26	"Funeral Arrangements Completed"	May 15, 1942
Couple Richard and Emily head to Merryvale to sort the affairs of mysterious Aunt Patricia, who has died. However, the town she lived in has not been occupied for some time and has a strangeness to it.
27	27	"Dead Hands Reaching"	May 22, 1942
Alan Blaine begins to receive advice from a mysterious voice from another world. Initially doing him good, he ignores its advice when he attempts to kill girlfriend Judith.
28	28	"Rendezvous with Satan"	May 29, 1942
An evil man, Carl Fisher, dies and meets with Satan. Carl is given twenty-four hours for a chance at redemption, and is sent back to Earth to do better.
29	29	"I Am Your Brother"	June 5, 1942
Julius Zummek's friend Stephan Hamblin dies after a life in which everyone believed he was mentally handicapped. However, Julius knows better and keeps his brain retained in a jar with special solution.
30	30	"Sleeping Death"	June 12, 1942
A patient visits a doctor, to discover that the doctor is the former head of a sanatorium he used to work at which was shut down leading to the doctor plotting his revenge.
31	31	"Demon Tree"	June 19, 1942
Episode was a second performance of the one which aired on 5 December 1941.
