= KKWD =

Radio station in Bethany–Oklahoma City, Oklahoma

Coordinates: 35.498°N 97.620°W

- Bethany, Oklahoma; United States
- Broadcast area: Oklahoma City metropolitan area
- Frequency: 104.9 MHz
- Branding: Alice 104.9

Programming
- Format: Adult hits

Ownership
- Owner: Cumulus Media; (Radio License Holding CBC, LLC)
- Sister stations: KYIS, KATT-FM, WWLS-FM, WKY

History
- First air date: October 1, 1965 (as KNBQ)
- Former call signs: KNBQ (1965–1971); KGOY (1971–1978); KJIL (1978–1990); KNTL (1990–2000); WWLS-FM (2000–2002); KQBL (2002–2003); WWLS-FM (2003–2006)
- Call sign meaning: Wild (previous format)

Technical information
- Facility ID: 6509
- Class: A
- ERP: 6,000 watts
- HAAT: 100 meters (330 ft)

Links
- Webcast: Listen live; Listen live; Listen live (via iHeartRadio)
- Website: alice1049.com

KKWD (104.9 FM, "Alice 104.9") is an adult hits radio station serving the Oklahoma City area. The Cumulus Media outlet broadcasts at 104.9 MHz with an effective radiated power of 6 kW and is licensed to Bethany, Oklahoma. Its studios are in Northwest Oklahoma City, and the transmitter is on the Westside.

== History ==
=== Early years ===
The station was on the air as Top 40 KNBQ in 1965 from the Coronado Shopping Center at 39th and MacArthur (NE Corner). In 1971 the station flipped to gospel and changed its call sign to KGOY (K-JOY). In 1978 the station was broadcasting inspirational music, then switched to a Christian Adult Contemporary format with the call sign KJIL ("Jesus Is Lord"). Shortly after being bought by Broadcast Equities, the station call sign was changed to KNTL ("News Talk Leader") on March 19, 1990. On April 20, 1991, KNTL became "The Light 105", and began broadcasting a contemporary Christian music format. Bott Radio Network acquired the station in November 1994, and kept the format until 1996, when it became Christian Teaching.

Citadel Broadcasting purchased the station, along with "SportsRadio 640" WWLS-AM and the intellectual property and format of "Sports Talk 1340" KGHM (then KEBC), in 1998. The purchase was finalized May 4, 1998, but the format was changed in advance (January 17, 1998) to sports talk. The station was known as WWLS-FM ("The Sports Animal”), a mirror of WWLS-AM, but on April 11, 2002, the Sports Animal moved to 105.3 FM. WWLS-FM then became "K-Bull" with the calls KQBL and adopted a country format. The country format did not last long; on December 27, 2002, the station returned to sports-talk “WWLS The Sports Animal." The station still operated under the KQBL calls until the WWLS-FM calls returned on March 6, 2003.

=== WILD 104.9 ===
Former "Wild 104.9" logo

On October 23, 2006, KKWD swapped frequencies with sister station WWLS-FM and moved to the 104.9 frequency from 97.9 FM in order to have a new high definition signal. Under its rhythmic contemporary format, KKWD primarily competed with Top 40 rival KJYO, as well as rimshot urban contemporary rival KVSP.

KKWD has been known for its outlandish stunts since its January 2000 launch, such as the April Fools' Day stunts where the on-air announcers from sister KINB performed all shifts in Spanish and where the station ran a continuous loop of the song "Wild Thing" by Tone Lōc for two consecutive weeks. Most recently, after a change in on-air presentation, the station was "quarantined" by a fictional government agency due to the possibility of an "epidemic" among the station's staff; at the end of the stunt it was revealed that the station in fact had "Spring Fever" in reference to an upcoming station concert.

Citadel Broadcasting relinquished 11 of its radio stations including KKWD to The Last Bastion Station Trust, LLC upon merger of many ABC Radio stations. However, as of June 19, 2008, Arbitron has expanded Oklahoma City's market definition allowing Citadel to own 5 FM stations in the said area, at which time Citadel Broadcasting applied to re-acquire KKWD from The Last Bastion Station Trust, LLC with the FCC. According to FCC documents, KKWD was re-absorbed into Citadel's station portfolio on July 9, 2009.

Following the purchase of Citadel Broadcasting by Cumulus Media in September 2011, KKWD's format was tweaked to focus heavier on older, more familiar hits from the past fifteen years with a de-emphasis on newer music and only adding currents by high-profile artists and/or are chart-toppers. In early 2016, the station was tweaked back to its original current-focused format.

=== Alice 104.9 ===
At approximately 3:15 p.m. on May 23, 2022, after playing "Freaky Deaky" by Tyga and Doja Cat and "Wild Thing" by Tone Loc, KKWD began stunting with construction sounds. At 5 p.m., KKWD flipped to adult hits, branded as "Alice 104.9". The flip brings the format and "Alice" moniker back to the market for the first time since KQOB dropped it nearly six months prior as part of Cumulus ending a local marketing agreement with that station's owners (KQOB now airs a news/talk format simulcasting KZLS). The first song on the revived "Alice" was "Don't Stop Believin'" by Journey.
