= KXLS =

Radio station in Lahoma–Enid, Oklahoma

- Lahoma, Oklahoma; United States
- Broadcast area: Enid, Oklahoma
- Frequency: 95.7 MHz
- Branding: My 95.7

Programming
- Format: Adult contemporary

Ownership
- Owner: Chisholm Trail Broadcasting Co.
- Sister stations: KNID, KCRC, KHRK, KWOF, KZLS, KWFF, KQOB

History
- First air date: May 14, 1993 (as KACL)
- Former call signs: KACL (5/1993-8/1993); KMKZ (1993–2000); KNID (7/12/2000-7/24/2000)

Technical information
- Licensing authority: FCC
- Facility ID: 17240
- Class: C3
- ERP: 14,000 watts
- HAAT: 137.0 meters (449.5 ft)
- Transmitter coordinates: 36°32′13.00″N 98°0′39.00″W

Links
- Public license information: Public file; LMS
- Webcast: Listen Live
- Website: my957kxls.com

KXLS (95.7 FM, "My 95.7") is a radio station broadcasting an adult contemporary music format. Licensed to Lahoma, Oklahoma, United States, the station serves the Enid, Oklahoma area and is currently owned by Chisholm Trail Broadcasting Co. The studios are located at 316 E. Willow Road.

== History ==
The station first broadcast under the callsign KACL May 14, 1993. It then changed to KMKZ on August 1, 1993. Briefly the station became KNID from July 12, 2000 to July 24, 2000 when it received its current callsign, KXLS. KXLS was also formerly the call sign for KOMA.

The KXLS call letters first appeared in northwest Oklahoma at 99.7 FM in early 1981. Using a frequency assigned to Alva, the station had a primary studio on Broadway near downtown Enid while using an auxiliary studio in Alva on weekend mornings. The initial owner was Zumma Broadcasting, with main owner William Lacy serving as General Manager. Lacy purchased an Oklahoma City FM station in the early 80's, changed its call letters to KZBS and played music very similar to KXLS. Both were modeled after the success of KVIL-FM in Dallas. For a short period, long-time KVIL afternoon host Mike Selden was part of the KXLS lineup.

KXLS called itself "Class FM," and gained national attention in the summer of 1982 for its "Zumma Beach" promotion. A hot tub was set up outside the station door, with sand surrounding it to give the impression of an oceanside beach hundreds of miles from the coast. The station also won Oklahoma Associated Press awards for its newscasts in 1983.

In the late 1980s, KXLS was part of the "LS Network" of radio stations owned by Kansas radio entrepreneur and personality Larry Steckline (the last two letters of "KXLS" are his initials; a similarity with other stations in the LS Network)

On July 14, 2017, KXLS rebranded as "My 95.7". Shortly after, the host of the prior The Oldies Show, Billy "PeeWee" Pritchett, died on October 14, 2018.
