= KOSU =

Radio station in Stillwater, Oklahoma

Coordinates: 35.5495°N 97.4972°W

- Stillwater, Oklahoma; United States
- Broadcast area: Oklahoma City metropolitan area
- Frequency: 91.7 MHz
- RDS: KOSU-NPR

Programming
- Format: Public / news/talk / AAA
- Affiliations: NPR, American Public Media, Public Radio Exchange, The Spy FM

Ownership
- Owner: Oklahoma State University

History
- First air date: December 29, 1955 (as KAMC)
- Former call signs: KAMC (1955–1958)
- Call sign meaning: Oklahoma State University

Technical information
- Licensing authority: FCC
- Facility ID: 50220
- Class: C0
- ERP: 100,000 watts
- HAAT: 308 meters (1,010 ft)
- Repeater: See § Repeaters

Links
- Public license information: Public file; LMS
- Webcast: Listen live
- Website: www.kosu.org

KOSU (91.7 FM) is a public non-commercial radio station operated by Oklahoma State University, with studios inside room number 303 of the Paul Miller Building on OSU's campus on West Hall of Fame Avenue in Stillwater, Oklahoma and on North Kien Avenue in the western edge of Downtown Oklahoma City, Oklahoma. The station broadcasts a mix of National Public Radio news, talk radio and adult album alternative (AAA) music from The Spy FM. The primary transmitter for the station is located about 3 miles west of the community of Seward, Oklahoma (between the cities of Guthrie and Edmond).

KOSU is one of several NPR member stations serving the Oklahoma City Metroplex, and the only NPR news and talk station to cover most of the market with its primary signal. The station's programming also airs on full-time satellites KOSN 107.5 FM in Ketchum, which serves the Tulsa area, KOSR 88.3 FM in Stillwater, K235CG 94.9 FM in Ponca City, and K297AQ 107.3 FM in Bixby.

== History ==
KOSU began broadcasting on December 29, 1955, as KAMC, owned by what was then Oklahoma Agricultural & Mechanical College. It became KOSU in 1958, after A&M won university status.

It was a charter member of NPR in 1971. Shortly after joining NPR, the station built a new tower that provided the Oklahoma City and Tulsa suburbs with city-grade coverage and each city with grade B coverage. This was possible because Stillwater is roughly halfway between Oklahoma City and Tulsa. It moved to a new 1,000-foot tower west of Stillwater in 1991.

In September 2004, KOSU moved to a new 1,100-foot tower near Guthrie that gave it primary coverage of Oklahoma City. Previously, NPR news and talk had gotten spotty reception in much of the area since KCSC went all-classical in 1996. The University of Oklahoma's NPR outlet, KGOU, needed a second full-power station, KROU, to cover a large portion of Oklahoma City, and even then this left much of central Oklahoma without a clear signal for NPR news programming until KOSU activated its new tower.

KOSU also added improved service to northeastern Oklahoma with the purchase of commercial station KGND in Ketchum in September 2004 by Public Radio Capital, which entered an LMA with Oklahoma State University to simulcast the KOSU signal. On the same day KOSU moved to its new tower, KGND changed its calls to KOSN.

In March 2006, KOSU added two new translators in the Tulsa area, at 101.9 FM in Okmulgee (owned by PRC) and 107.3 FM in Bixby (owned directly by OSU). In 2011, KOSU added a new station on KOSR 88.3 FM in Stillwater.

On August 20, 2012, KOSU unveiled a new tag line, "Uniquely Oklahoma", and implemented changes in their daily schedule with new news/talk and music programs. At the core of the changes was a content partnership with The Spy FM, which can be heard on weeknights and sporadically on the weekends on KOSU.

In February 2013, Oklahoma State University received a $150-thousand grant from the Ethics and Excellence in Journalism Foundation in support of a new broadcast facility for KOSU. In September 2013, KOSU's Oklahoma City studios opened in the Hart Building in the historic Film Exchange District (Film Row). The new studios include a digital newsroom and a public performance studio that can accommodate up to 50 guests for concerts and community conversations. KOSU now originates live broadcasts from the downtown Oklahoma City studios as well as its original studios on the OSU campus.

In June 2014, KOSU announced that it would be joining the Clinton Global Initiative Project to Preserve American Indian Languages. "KOSU is committing its facilities and expertise during the next year to produce 250 book narrations in five indigenous languages."

== Repeaters ==
| Call sign | Frequency | City of license | State | Class | ERP (W) | Height (m (ft)) | FCC info |
|---|---|---|---|---|---|---|---|
| KOSN | 107.5 FM | Ketchum | Oklahoma | C1 | 100,000 | 299 m (981 ft) | FCC (KOSN) |
| KOSR | 88.3 FM | Stillwater | Oklahoma | A | 1,200 | 33.5 m (110 ft) | FCC (KOSR) |

=== Translators ===
| Call sign | Frequency | City of license | FID | ERP (W) | Class | FCC info | Notes |
|---|---|---|---|---|---|---|---|
| K297AQ | 107.3 FM | Bixby, Oklahoma | 157891 | 95 | D | LMS | Relays KOSN |
| K235CG | 94.9 FM | Ponca City, Oklahoma | 156433 | 250 | D | LMS | Relays KOSU |
