= WIII (FM) =

Radio station in Cortland, New York

Coordinates: 42.5565°N 76.1549°W

- Cortland, New York; United States
- Broadcast area: Central New York
- Frequency: 99.9 MHz
- Branding: I 100

Programming
- Format: Classic rock
- Affiliations: Westwood One; New York Giants Radio Network

Ownership
- Owner: Saga Communications; (Saga Communications of New England, LLC)
- Sister stations: WFIZ, WHCU, WNYY, WQNY, WYXL

History
- First air date: November 14, 1957
- Former call signs: WKRT-FM (1957–1978); WNOZ (1978–); WOKW (–1989) WNYP (1989–1992); WYYS (1992–1994)

Technical information
- Licensing authority: FCC
- Facility ID: 9427
- Class: B
- ERP: 26,000 watts
- HAAT: 208 meters (682 ft)
- Translator: 100.3 W262AD (Ithaca)

Links
- Public license information: Public file; LMS
- Webcast: Listen live
- Website: i100rocks.com

WIII (99.9 FM), branded as I-100, is a commercial radio station licensed to Cortland, New York, United States, and serving Central New York with a classic rock format as "I 100". It is owned by Saga Communications, and operates as part of its Cayuga Radio Group.

Programming is also heard on 250-watt FM translator W262AD at 100.3 MHz in Ithaca, New York.

== History ==
The station signed on the air on November 14, 1957. Its original call sign was WKRT-FM, the counterpart to WKRT 920 AM. The two stations simulcast a full service, middle of the road format of popular music, news and sports. They were owned by Radio Cortland, Inc.

The station later broke away with its own programming. In 1994, it changed its call letters to WIII. In the 1990s, WKRT and WIII were owned by Citadel Broadcasting. In 2007, Citadel decided to sell its stations in the Ithaca market to Saga Communications. Because of market ownership caps, Saga donated WYBY to the Bible Broadcasting Network, while keeping WIII.

The WIII call letters have been in place since November 1994 - prior to that it was WKRT-FM, WYYS, WNYP-FM and WOKW.

The station lineup includes The Bob & Tom Show in mornings. WIII joined the New York Giants Radio Network in 2012.

== Translator ==
WIII also broadcasts on the following translator:

Call sign	Frequency	City of license	FID	ERP (W)	Class	FCC info
W262AD	100.3 FM	Ithaca, New York	9429	250	D	LMS
