= KCRC (AM) =

- Enid, Oklahoma; United States
- Broadcast area: Enid, Oklahoma
- Frequency: 1390 kHz
- Branding: CTB Sports 1640 AM/1390 AM

Programming
- Format: Sports
- Affiliations: Fox Sports Radio

Ownership
- Owner: Chisholm Trail Broadcasting Co.
- Sister stations: KXLS; KNID; KHRK; KWOF; KZLS; KWFF; KQOB

History
- First air date: 1926
- Former call signs: KGCB (1926–1929)
- Call sign meaning: Champlin Refining Company

Technical information
- Licensing authority: FCC
- Facility ID: 10856
- Class: B
- Power: 1,000 watts unlimited
- Transmitter coordinates: 36°25′11.1″N 97°52′29.2″W
- Repeater: 1640 KZLS (Enid)

Links
- Public license information: Public file; LMS
- Webcast: streamdb5web.securenetsystems.net/cirrusencore/KCRC
- Website: www.enidlive.com/1390-kcrc

KCRC (1390 kHz, "CTB Sports 1640 AM/1390 AM") is a sports AM radio station serving the Enid, Oklahoma, area and is owned by Chisholm Trail Broadcasting, Co. The studios are located in Enid at 316 E. Willow.

== History ==
The station was first licensed on August 19, 1926, under the call sign KGCB, to the Wallace Radio Institute in Oklahoma City. In early 1929 the station was bought by the Champlin Refining Company, which changed the call sign to KCRC. The station was a charter member of the Oklahoma Network when it was formed in 1937.

=== Expanded Band assignment ===
On March 17, 1997, the Federal Communications Commission (FCC) announced that eighty-eight stations had been given permission to move to newly available "Expanded Band" transmitting frequencies, ranging from 1610 to 1700 kHz, with KCRC authorized to move from 1390 to 1640 kHz. An application for the new expanded band station, also licensed to Enid, was filed in 1997, which was issued a construction permit the next year, and after a series of call letter changes became KZLS.

The FCC's initial policy was that both the original station and its expanded band counterpart could operate simultaneously for up to five years, after which owners would have to turn in one of the two licenses, depending on whether they preferred the new assignment or elected to remain on the original frequency. However, this deadline has been extended multiple times, and both stations have remained authorized. One restriction is that the FCC has generally required paired original and expanded band stations to remain under common ownership.

== See also ==
- H. H. Champlin House
