= Revolution (The Cult song) =

1985 single by the Cult

Single by the Cult

from the album Love
- Released: 22 November 1985
- Genre: Rock
- Length: 5:20
- Label: Beggars Banquet
- Songwriters: Ian Astbury; Billy Duffy
- Producer: Steve Brown

The Cult singles chronology
"Rain" (1985)	"Revolution" (1985)	"Love Removal Machine" (1987)

Music video
- "Revolution" on YouTube

"Revolution" is a song by the English rock band the Cult. It was released on 22 November 1985 by Beggars Banquet Records, as the third single from the Cult's second studio album Love (1985), written by Ian Astbury and Billy Duffy. The song has been described as a "power ballad".

== Song construction ==
It has been noted that the chord progression in the song is the same as "She Sells Sanctuary" and "Rain", the first two singles from the Love album.
