= KVSP =

Coordinates: 35.251°N 98.615°W

Anadarko, Oklahoma; United States
- Broadcast area: Central Oklahoma
- Frequency: 103.5 MHz
- Branding: Power 103.5

Programming
- Format: Mainstream urban
- Affiliations: Compass Media Networks

Ownership
- Owner: Perry Publishing and Broadcasting
- Sister stations: KRMP, KINB

History
- First air date: 1981 as KRPT-FM (Anadarko, OK); 1994 as KVSP on 1140 AM
- Former call signs: KRPT-FM (1981–2003); KRMP (2003–2004)
- Call sign meaning: Kevin, Velvet, & Shannon Perry (station owner's children)

Technical information
- Licensing authority: FCC
- Facility ID: 2189
- Class: C
- ERP: 100,000 watts
- HAAT: 600 meters (2,000 ft)

Links
- Public license information: Public file; LMS
- Webcast: Listen Live
- Website: kvsp.com

KVSP (103.5 FM) is a mainstream urban radio station serving Central Oklahoma, Licensed to Anadarko and owned by the locally based Perry Publishing and Broadcasting. Its studios are located at Perry Plaza II in the Eastside district of Oklahoma City and its transmitter is located in Alfalfa, Oklahoma. The tower the transmitter antenna is located on is the tallest structure in the state of Oklahoma, although Oklahoma City itself is in the "distant" area of the coverage area, according to Radio-Locator.com. This is due to the 103.5 frequency being one space away from the 103.7 frequency in Okemah (with that station providing "fringe" coverage rimshotting Oklahoma City from the east as well as rimshotting nearby Tulsa from the southwest), making it difficult to properly cover the market.

== History ==
KRPT-FM went on the air as a Country station in 1981 serving the Anadarko area. The station later changed its calls to KRMP in March 2003 and became known as "Superstar Country 103.5." The station moved to southwest of Oklahoma City from Anadarko in July 2004 and became KVSP "Power 103.5" with a Mainstream Urban format making it Oklahoma City's first Urban station on the FM dial since KAEZ (Now Sports KRXO-FM) departed in 1985.

Meanwhile, KVSP was launched as an Urban Contemporary radio station in 1993 on 1140 AM and was called Power Jammin' 1140. It was the first African American-owned and operated station under Perry Broadcasting's ownership as the Oklahoma radio market was not serving the Black community too well at the time based on Perry's perceptions; Perry would later acquire and launch sister station KJMM in Tulsa the year after as part of the "Power Jammin' Network". For years KVSP played Hip Hop, R&B, Old School/Classic Soul and Gospel for years, and was the home of the Tom Joyner Morning Show.

Previous logo formatting

When KVSP relocated to the FM dial position in 2004, it was renamed Power 103.5. Upon the transition, KVSP modified its format to Mainstream Urban and began carrying the Doug Banks Morning Show. As for the 1140 AM frequency, it is now an Urban adult contemporary formatted station as Heart & Soul, swapped call letters KVSP for KRMP (previously on 103.5), and aired The Tom Joyner Morning Show. After Doug Banks went off the air for good, KVSP replaced it with The Rickey Smiley Morning Show. In January 2020, when The Rickey Smiley Morning Show was sent to Sister Station KRMP when The Tom Joyner Morning Show went off the air for good, KVSP replaced the show with the new syndicated Urban Morning Show The Morning Hustle.
