= KZLS (AM) =

Radio station in Enid, Oklahoma

Simulcasts KCRC, Enid
- Enid, Oklahoma; United States
- Broadcast area: Oklahoma City Metroplex
- Frequency: 1640 kHz
- Branding: CTB Sports 1640 AM/1390 AM

Programming
- Format: Sports
- Affiliations: Fox Sports Radio

Ownership
- Owner: Chisholm Trail Broadcasting Co.
- Sister stations: KCRC; KHRK; KNID; KWOF; KXLS; KQOB; KWFF

History
- First air date: May 15, 1998
- Former call signs: KBFQ (1998–2000); KMMZ (2000); KMKZ (2000); KMMZ (2000); KFNY (2004–2005); KFXY (2005–2013); KOAG (2013)

Technical information
- Licensing authority: FCC
- Facility ID: 87168
- Class: B
- Power: 10,000 watts (day); 1,000 watts (night)
- Transmitter coordinates: 36°6′55.1″N 97°45′24.2″W

Links
- Public license information: Public file; LMS
- Webcast: Listen live
- Website: www.enidlive.com/1390-kcrc

KZLS (1640 kHz) is a commercial AM radio station in Enid, Oklahoma. The station is currently owned by Chisholm Trail Broadcasting Co. The transmitter is off Oklahoma State Highway 51 in Hennessey, Oklahoma. KZLS is powered at 10,000 watts by day and 1,000 watts at night, using a directional antenna at all times.

KZLS airs a sports radio format.

== History ==
KZLS originated as the expanded band "twin" of an existing station on the standard AM band. On March 17, 1997, the Federal Communications Commission (FCC) announced that eighty-eight stations had been given permission to move to newly available "Expanded Band" transmitting frequencies, ranging from 1610 to 1700 kHz, with KCRC in Enid authorized to move from 1390 to 1640 kHz.

The FCC's initial policy was that both the original station and its expanded band counterpart could operate simultaneously for up to five years, after which owners would have to turn in one of the two licenses, depending on whether they preferred the new assignment or elected to remain on the original frequency. However, this deadline has been extended multiple times, and both stations have remained authorized. One restriction is that the FCC has generally required paired original and expanded band stations to remain under common ownership.

The new expanded band station on 1640 kHz was assigned the call letters KBFQ on May 15, 1998. In June 2000, the station changed its call sign to KMMZ and a few months later on November 24, 2000, to KMKZ. The station then reverted to KMMZ on September 15, 2003, and on February 16, 2004, became KFNY. On March 30, 2005, the station became KFXY, and then took on the KOAG call sign on January 1, 2013. On September 27, 2013, it was assigned the call sign KZLS, which had previously been used by a sister station at 99.7 FM.

On February 19, 2014, KZLS was planned to adopt a news/talk format. In 2022, after the conservative talk format of 1640 The Eagle moved to 96.9, the station flipped to sports using Fox Sports Radio and simulcasting with KCRC.
