= KATT-FM =

Coordinates: 35.560°N 97.486°W

- Oklahoma City, Oklahoma; United States
- Broadcast area: Oklahoma City Metroplex
- Frequency: 100.5 MHz
- Branding: ROCK 100.5 The KATT

Programming
- Format: Mainstream rock
- Affiliations: United Stations Radio Networks; Westwood One

Ownership
- Owner: Cumulus Media; (Radio License Holding CBC, LLC)
- Sister stations: KKWD, KWPN, KYIS, WKY, WWLS-FM

History
- First air date: 1960
- Former call signs: KJAK (1960–1976); KATT (9/1976-12/1976)
- Call sign meaning: Similar to "cat"

Technical information
- Licensing authority: FCC
- Facility ID: 8797
- Class: C1
- ERP: 31,000 watts
- HAAT: 470 meters (1,540 ft)

Links
- Public license information: Public file; LMS
- Webcast: Listen live
- Website: katt.com

KATT-FM (100.5 MHz, "ROCK 100.5 The KATT") is a commercial radio station in Oklahoma City, Oklahoma. It is owned by Cumulus Media and airs a mainstream rock radio format. The playlist leans toward hard-edged classic rock with some current and recent titles included.

The studios and offices are on NW 64th Street in Northwest Oklahoma City. The transmitter is on the Northeast side on Ridgeway Road off NE 78th Street.

== History ==
=== Early years ===
In 1960, the station first signed on as a stand-alone FM station, not co-owned with an established AM outlet. It was owned by Ramar, Inc., and had its transmitter at the top of the Oklahoma Biltmore Hotel in downtown Oklahoma City. KIOO was started by two brothers from Northern Kentucky, Steve and Ted Bushelman.

The station later switched to country music when it went by the call sign KJAK under the ownership of Jack Beasley's Big Chief Broadcasting Company. KJAK was co-owned with KLPR (1140 AM, now KRMP). It was a daytimer country station in Oklahoma City. Jack Beasley, being a musician himself, had many ties to the country music industry.

KLPR also owned a short-lived television station, KLPR-TV, on the air in 1966 and 1967. When Beasley got older, he owner-financed a sale of KLPR and KJAK to Ed Sossen. Due to Sossen's financial issues and two suspicious fires, the stations were subject to a bank takeover. After the fires, Bill Lacy ran the stations as the GM for the debtor in possession of the stations while a new owner could be found.

=== Progressive rock ===
The FM station was changed to a progressive rock format, applying for the call letters KATT. It began broadcasting as "FM 100-The Cat" on September 16, 1976. Once an hour, a legal ID mumbled by Ira Lipson identified the station as KJAK, Oklahoma City. The station received the official telegram from the Federal Communications Commission on Christmas Day, 1976 authorizing a call sign change to KATT. Transmission and studio facilities for KATT were below the AM tower in what was a former TV transmitter building, while the AM's studios were located adjacent to the old TV studio.

KATT quickly became a success, filling a void for rock music that wasn't as pop-sounding as found on Top 40 stations. With increased FM ratings, KATT and KLPR were sold to Sun Broadcasting of Dallas, which paid $866,000 for the AM/FM combo properties. Bill Lacey exited at the sale time as General Manager. After the sale, the AM calls were changed to KATT and the FM became KATT-FM. Also after the sale, the FM studios were moved out of the transmitter building and combined with the facilities used by the AM. The former KATT transmitter site was located near I-240 and I-35.

The KATT call sign was chosen by Ira "Eye" Lipson. He was the programming consultant to KATT, while serving as program director of KZEW "The Zoo" in Dallas. Barbara Marullo was the original program director. Air personalities in the early days included Stan Tacker, Traver Hulse, Jim Stafford (Jimbob), Linda (Gabby) Goldfarb, John Michael Scott, David Bell, Charlie Parker, and Danny Hopper. Stan, Traver, and Jim rotated morning drive time duties until Gabby came on board. Then it was Jim & Gabby for about one year. John Michael Scott handled middays, David Bell was on in the evenings. Hopper was the first overnight DJ, later followed by Parker.

KATT's popularity saw a shift in radio listening for young adults in Oklahoma City. Some Top 40 AM stations attempted to catch the wave of progressive rock by featuring artists like Led Zeppelin, Rolling Stones and Bob Dylan at night to show they were hip. KATT featured artists such as The Grateful Dead, Fleetwood Mac, The Who and Bob Seger on a regular basis. The station's on air personalities renamed the old cow town "Zoom City" and played long thematic sets of music that had not been heard on Oklahoma City radio. The concert calendar was filled with acts that got the support they needed to sell out the Myriad, Lloyd Noble Arena and the Fairgrounds on a regular basis.

With successful Arbitron ratings, KATT stickers appeared on the rear windows of cars that crowded the parking lots of the Zoo Amphitheatre and the downtown Civic Center. There was even an animated television commercial on late night programs featuring the smiling form of the cartoon cat from the sticker finding his way along the highways of Oklahoma City.

=== Move to album rock ===
In the 1980s, the station shifted from a free form direction to a more structured album rock format, featuring the top tracks from the biggest selling rock albums. In 1999, KATT was acquired by Citadel Broadcasting, the forerunner to today's Cumulus Media.

For many years, KATT was powered at 100,000 watts, the maximum for non-grandfathered FM stations. It broadcast from a tower at 1,191 feet in height above average terrain (HAAT). In March 2008, KATT got a boost in antenna height, going up to 1,542 feet (470 meters), but downgraded from a Class C to a Class C1, reducing to 29,000 watts in effective radiated power (ERP). This allowed for the upgrade of co-owned WWLS-FM, now broadcasting at the same power, 29,000 watts.
