= KQOB =

Radio station in Enid–Oklahoma City, Oklahoma

Coordinates: 35.981°N 97.695°W

- Enid, Oklahoma; United States
- Broadcast area: Oklahoma City Metroplex
- Frequency: 96.9 MHz
- Branding: Freedom 96.9

Programming
- Format: Conservative talk
- Network: Townhall News
- Affiliations: Compass Media Networks; Fox News Talk; Salem Radio Network; Westwood One

Ownership
- Owner: Champlin Broadcasting, Inc.
- Sister stations: KWFF, KCRC, KNID, KWOF, KXLS, KZLS

History
- First air date: May 1, 1967
- Former call signs: KCRC-FM (1967–1977); KNID (1977–2000); KMKZ (2000); KMMZ (2000–2003); KQBL (2003)
- Call sign meaning: former BOB FM format

Technical information
- Licensing authority: FCC
- Facility ID: 10857
- Class: C
- ERP: 98,000 watts; 100,000 with beam tilt
- HAAT: 451 meters (1,480 ft)

Links
- Public license information: Public file; LMS
- Webcast: Listen live
- Website: freedom969.com

KQOB (96.9 FM) is a commercial radio station licensed to Enid, Oklahoma, and serving the Oklahoma City Metroplex. It is owned by Champlin Broadcasting and calls itself Freedom 96.9. KQOB airs a talk radio format with studios and offices on NW 64th Street in Oklahoma City.

KQOB is a Class C FM station with an effective radiated power (ERP) of 98,000 watts (100,000 with beam tilt). The transmitter is on North 2980 Road in Crescent, Oklahoma, about 25 miles north of Oklahoma City.

== History ==
=== KCRC-FM and KMMZ ===
The station signed on the air on May 1, 1967. The original call sign was KCRC-FM, the FM counterpart to KCRC. KCRC-FM was separately programmed with a beautiful music format, playing quarter hour sweeps of mostly instrumental cover versions of popular songs. It later switched its call letters to KNID and had a mostly country format until 2000. On July 12, 2000, the station changed its call sign to KMKZ.

On November 24, 2000, its call sign became KMMZ. It moved to a tower closer to Oklahoma City, changed its slogan to "Memories 96.9", and began using the ABC Network’s “Memories” network for its programming.

=== The Bull and BOB FM ===
KMMZ began stunting on November 13, 2002, and adopted the slogan “The Bull's Oklahoma Christmas”, playing Christmas music by country artists. On December 26, 2002, the station adopted “The Bull” slogan and Red Dirt Country format from then-KQBL (104.9 FM). The station began using the KQBL call sign on September 1, 2003.

The station began stunting again at 9 a.m. on November 3, 2003 with a brief all-comedy format. At 10:45 that morning, the station became "96.9 BOB FM" with an adult hits format. The station switched call letters to KQOB on December 8, 2003.

On June 10, 2015, KQOB dropped the "Bob FM" branding and rebranded as "Classic Rock 96.9". It began playing classic rock songs from the 1960s through the early 90s.

=== Classic hits ===
On November 23, 2015, at 7 p.m., after playing "That's All" by Genesis, KQOB began playing Christmas music as simply "96.9". The first song was "Christmas All Over Again" by Tom Petty. In addition to the change, Jack Elliott and Ron Williams, formerly of KYIS, became the station’s new morning show hosts beginning December 3.

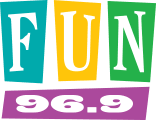
Logo as Fun 96.9, from 2015 to 2017.

On December 28, 2015, at 6 a.m., after playing "A Holly Jolly Christmas" by Alan Jackson, KQOB flipped to classic hits as "Fun 96.9." The first song on "Fun" was "Old Time Rock & Roll" by Bob Seger. Cumulus touted the station as "the right mix of pop and rock hits from the '60s, '70s, and '80s, plus legendary Oklahoma City on-air talents, including Jack and Ron each morning." Program Director Jeff Couch, midday host Leo Cage and afternoon duo Inzinga and Spinozi remained in place. Joining the on-air weekend staff in middays was Fred Hendrickson, who had been at classic hits competitor KOMA for the past 25 years.

On December 31, 2017, at midnight, KQOB flipped back to adult hits as "Alice 96.9." All of the DJs were let go with the change.

=== The Eagle and Freedom 96.9 ===
On December 3, 2021, Cumulus Media announced it would end its local marketing agreement (LMA) with KQOB on January 1, 2022. Champlin, in turn, announced it would flip KQOB to a simulcast of conservative talk station KZLS as "96.9 The Eagle". (The "Alice" branding and adult hits format would return to the market on former sister station KKWD as "Alice 104.9" in May 2022.)

Just before midnight on December 31, after playing "Maneater" by Hall & Oates, KQOB began stunting with a "free preview" of sister station KNAH. The stunting ended on January 3 at 5 a.m., when the simulcast with KZLS began. In January 2022, KZLS split from simulcasting with KQOB when it started simulcasting KZLS.

On November 22, 2022, KQOB rebranded as "Freedom 96.9", with no other changes. The rebrand came after KQOB registered a 0.6 share in the October 2022 Nielsen ratings, well behind KTOK’s 2.0 share, but slightly ahead of KOKC with its 0.4 share.
