= KYIS =

Coordinates: 35.560°N 97.486°W

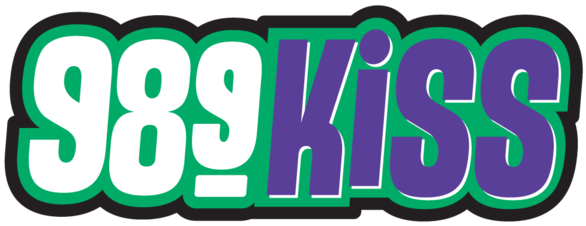
- Oklahoma City, Oklahoma; United States
- Broadcast area: Oklahoma City metropolitan area
- Frequency: 98.9 MHz
- Branding: 98.9 KISS FM

Programming
- Format: Hot adult contemporary
- Affiliations: Westwood One

Ownership
- Owner: Cumulus Media; (Radio License Holding CBC, LLC)
- Sister stations: KATT-FM; WKY; KWPN; WWLS-FM; KKWD

History
- First air date: 1939? (as W5XAU); June 1969 (as KFJL)
- Former call signs: W5XAU (1939–?); WKY-FM (1947–1958); KYFM (1958–1969); KFJL (1969–1979); KTLS (1979–1980); KLNK (1980–1983); KZBS (1983–1991)
- Call sign meaning: Similar to "Kiss"

Technical information
- Licensing authority: FCC
- Facility ID: 8798
- Class: C
- ERP: 100,000 watts
- HAAT: 470 meters (1,540 ft)

Links
- Public license information: Public file; LMS
- Webcast: Listen live
- Website: www.kyis.com

KYIS (98.9 FM, "98.9 KISS FM") is a hot adult contemporary radio station serving the Oklahoma City area and is owned by Cumulus Media. KYIS's studios are located in Northwest Oklahoma City and a transmitter site is in the Northside of the city.

== History ==
The earliest known format of the station is urban contemporary when it went by the call letters KFJL in the 1970s. Another early callsign of the station was KYFM with its transmitter located on the Lakeshore tower near the Northwest Expressway and May Avenue. At one point, the transmitter location was co-located on the 890 AM tower at Britton and Eastern. The calls were then changed to KTLS (The LifeStyle), and flipped to a Christian format.

It changed calls in September 1980 to KLNK, and ran an adult contemporary format known as "The Link". Bill Lacey of Zuma Broadcasting changed calls again in 1983 to KZBS and the station was known as "Z99" and "99FM" for a time. KZBS was known for many extravagant promotions including a home giveaway that was surrounded by a great deal of controversy. KZBS switched between Top 40, Rhythmic Top 40 and hot adult contemporary, and switched full-time to hot AC, becoming KYIS (KISS-FM), on August 28, 1991. The station became successful in 1993 with new program director Jon Zellner, who hosted afternoons. Zellner hired the Jack and Ron morning show and Kathi Yeager for middays. KYIS started making serious inroads against competitor KJYO with Zellner and later with another program director, Ray Kalusa. Jack and Ron stayed on until 2016, when they were moved to sister station KQOB.

Dial/Greyhound repossessed KZBS from Zuma in 1990, and then the station was debt-combined with KATT-FM in August 1994.
