= Citadel Broadcasting =

American radio broadcasting company

Citadel Broadcasting Corporation
- Industry: Radio Broadcasting
- Founded: June 18, 1984
- Defunct: September 16, 2011
- Fate: Purchased and absorbed into Cumulus Media
- Successor: Cumulus Media
- Headquarters: Las Vegas, Nevada, USA
- Area served: United States
- Key people: Larry Wilson, Founder/CEO
- Revenue: US$719,760,000 (2007)
- Divisions: Citadel Media

Citadel Broadcasting Corporation was a Las Vegas, Nevada-based broadcast holding company founded and developed by Larry Wilson. Citadel owned 243 radio stations across the United States and was the third-largest radio station owner in the country. Just prior to Citadel's merger with Cumulus, only Clear Channel Communications (now iHeartMedia) and Cumulus Media owned more stations.

On March 10, 2011, Cumulus Media announced that it would purchase Citadel Broadcasting. After receiving conditional regulatory approval from the U.S. Department of Justice and the Federal Communications Commission, the deal was approved by Citadel shareholders on September 15, 2011. The merger of the two companies closed on September 16, 2011, and Citadel was immediately absorbed into Cumulus Media.

== History ==
The company was founded in 1984 in Phoenix, Arizona by Larry Wilson as Citadel Associates Limited Partnership. In 1990 it was renamed Citadel Associates Montana Limited Partnership for the purpose of owning and operating stations in Montana that were formerly owned by CALP. A year later, Citadel Broadcasting was officially incorporated and in 1984 it acquired all of the radio stations owned by its predecessors. Within a decade, Citadel expanded to 26 states. Within that time period, it absorbed all Bloomington Broadcasting radio holdings and 11 stations from Dick Broadcasting Company and also acquired three radio stations from Slone Broadcasting, Inc. and Slone Radio, LLC. In 2000, Liggett Broadcasting sold its radio stations in Michigan, New York, Minnesota, South Carolina, Ohio, and California to Citadel, with Bob Liggett becoming a member of Citadel's Board of Directors. In 2001, Larry Wilson sold Citadel to private equity firm Forstmann Little & Company for $2.1 billion. By that time, the company had grown to 205 stations in 42 markets.

In January 2005, Citadel yanked Howard Stern's syndicated radio show from four of its stations, with Stern saying it was because he was talking too much about his impending switch to Sirius Satellite Radio. Stern then began to make fun of Citadel's chairman and CEO, Farid Suleman. Citadel Broadcasting launched an online subsidiary called Citadel Interactive in 2005, and a year later launched Right Now Radio under Citadel Interactive's operation. By June 2007, scores of Citadel stations could be streamed online.

=== Purchase of ABC Radio ===
Citadel Broadcasting logo prior to 2007 acquisition of ABC Radio.

On February 6, 2006, Forstmann Little and The Walt Disney Company agreed to merge Citadel with Disney's ABC Radio. Shares representing 57% of Citadel were distributed to shareholders of The Walt Disney Company following the company's acquisition of 22 stations from ABC Radio.

After the merger—which was consummated June 12, 2007, Citadel's ownership structure was:

- 57%: Shareholders in The Walt Disney Company
- 27%: Forstmann Little
- 16%: Former Citadel shareholders exclusive of Forstmann Little or shareholders in Disney

ABC owned and operated affiliates of Radio Disney and ESPN Radio were not included in the merger agreement.

In order to comply with FCC ownership limitations, Citadel sold off 12 of its radio stations. Ten of the stations' licenses were transferred to a newly formed trust company, The Last Bastion Station Trust, LLC. The two-station Cortland, New York, cluster was sold off prior to the merger in a separate transaction; WIII was sold to Saga Communications, and WKRT (now WYBY) was given to the Bible Broadcasting Network for free as a tax-deductible donation.

In December 2007, Citadel began broadcasting the morning radio show of shock jock Don Imus, just about six months after he had been fired by CBS for making racist and sexist remarks.

On June 19, 2008; Arbitron expanded Oklahoma City's market definition allowing Citadel to own five FM stations in the said area, at which time Citadel Broadcasting applied to re-acquire KKWD from The Last Bastion Station Trust, LLC with the Federal Communications Commission (FCC). According to FCC documents, KKWD was re-absorbed into Citadel's station portfolio on July 9, 2009.

On April 2, 2009; the staff of Citadel Broadcasting changed the name of "ABC Radio" to Citadel Media to reflect its ownership of the major network.

In addition to Citadel Media, Citadel owned the Arkansas Radio, Tennessee Titans Radio, Buffalo Bills and the Michigan Talk radio networks.

=== Company troubles ===
On March 1, 2008, the former Disney/ABC Radio stations in Citadel's portfolio faced severe financial problems. That same period, hundreds of personalities were dismissed as some stations over time changed formats—most notably to ABC Radio's in-house satellite network The True Oldies Channel.

On September 12, 2008, Citadel Broadcasting received a notice from the New York Stock Exchange (NYSE) warning them that they would be facing a delisting after the company shares fell below the continuing listing criteria in the past 30 days: after an IPO of $20.67 in August 2003, and a high of $22.70 in December 2003, CDL had closed at $0.01 on March 6, 2009. Delisting happened on March 5, 2009.

Since the delisting, the staff of Citadel Broadcasting ceased holding conference calls and said they would no longer issue quarterly guidance; but their 10-Q filed May 7, 2010 at the U.S. Securities and Exchange Commission (SEC) indicated that Citadel expected to remain in compliance with lender covenants through 2009. Given the conditions, it was unlikely that the company would meet the benchmarks it had to hit in 2010, starting January 15 of that year. Citadel was carrying $2 billion in debt following the June 12, 2007 deal with Disney for the ABC Radio properties. Overall, Citadel's revenue fell almost 23%.

In a quarterly SEC filing, the company disclosed the possibility of a Chapter 11 bankruptcy. The company, in the filing, said that it "does not expect to meet its covenant requirements under the Senior Credit and Term Facility as of January 15, 2010." The Wall Street Journal reported that Citadel worked on a "prearranged" bankruptcy package in which lenders would get ownership of Citadel in exchange for forgiving about $2 billion of the company's $2.76 billion-dollar debt. The filing began on December 20, 2009.

During that period, its senior lenders took 90% of the equity, and the re-structuring approved by a Manhattan federal bankruptcy judge was completed. It emerged from bankruptcy in June 2010, owned by its lenders, the Dallas hedge fund R2 Investments, JPMorgan Chase and the buyout firm TPG. The company's debt was reduced from $2.14 billion to $762.5 million, and the broadcaster was poised to be an acquirer as well as an operator.

=== Acquisition by Cumulus Media ===
Months after Citadel Broadcasting emerged from bankruptcy, it was approached by Atlanta-based Cumulus Media with two unsolicited merger offers, both of which Citadel rejected. Then in February 2011, CNBC reported Cumulus was in "exclusive negotiations" to acquire Citadel. This third offer would be worth $2.5 billion to Citadel shareholders, some of whom were said to have already been pushing the board to consider a sale.

On March 10, 2011, Citadel Broadcasting announced via email that it had been purchased by Cumulus Media in a deal worth $2.4 billion. Some of the Cumulus or Citadel radio stations would, however, have to be transferred into a trust to comply with the FCC's ownership limitations, especially in those markets where Citadel already had a "grandfathered" over-the-limit station group. Ultimately these included WELJ in Montauk, New York and WCAT-FM in Carlisle, Pennsylvania, placed in a trust operated by Scott Knoblauch.

Cumulus Media's purchase of Citadel became final on September 16, 2011. The remaining stations that were acquired from Citadel are listed in the FCC database as owned by Radio License Holding CBC, LLC.

== Employee poaching suit ==
In early 2007, Citadel Broadcasting filed a lawsuit against Peak Broadcasting, claiming Peak raided its staff and secured company information. Peak operated in the Boise, Idaho market after purchasing six radio stations from Clear Channel Communications. Citadel also owns six stations in Boise. The suit claimed that one of the former Citadel employees stole a computer disk with critical information after asking the Citadel IT person to help him copy information, which Peak then used to compete against Citadel in Fresno, California, as well. Peak has denied the allegations, but the two parties reached a confidential settlement, which included an undisclosed payment to Citadel, according to the Idaho Statesman.

== Becoming environmentally friendly ==
In April 2008, Citadel Broadcasting became the first radio company to fully join the Environmental Protection Agency's "Green Power Partnership Program" and committed US$1 million in Educational Green public service announcements. In April 2008, ABC/Citadel's KGO in San Francisco, California was installing equipment for broadcasting with solar power during the daytime hours. The maximum rated output of the solar cells installed at the KGO transmitter site is a little over 7 kW, which under ideal conditions is about 15% of the 50 kW of power radiated by the station's transmitter during daytime hours.
