= 97.7 FM =

FM radio frequency

The following radio stations broadcast on FM frequency 97.7 MHz:

== Argentina ==
- Radio Maria in 30 de agosto, Buenos Aires
- Radio Maria in Termas de Río Hondo, Santiago del Estero

== Australia ==
- 3SER in Melbourne, Victoria
- ABC Classic in Perth, Western Australia
- ABC Classic in Roma, Queensland
- 3GVR in Shepparton, Victoria
- Rhema FM in Darwin, Northern Territory
- SBS Radio in Sydney, New South Wales
- 2SKI in Cooma, New South Wales
- The Breeze in Gloucester, New South Wales
- Triple J in Gold Coast, Queensland
- TOTE Sport Radio in Burnie, Tasmania

== Brazil ==
- Costa do Sol FM (ZYS 804) in Fortaleza, Ceará

== Canada (Channel 249) ==
- CBF-FM-4 in Matagami, Quebec
- CBKF-FM in Regina, Saskatchewan
- CBTN-FM in Fernie, British Columbia
- CBUF-FM in Vancouver, British Columbia
- CFBI-FM in Cambridge Bay, Nunavut
- CFCV-FM in St. Andrew's, Newfoundland and Labrador
- CFGP-FM in Grande Prairie, Alberta
- CFTH-FM-1 in Harrington Harbour, Quebec
- CHDH-FM in Siksika, Alberta
- CHGB-FM in Wasaga Beach, Ontario
- CHMS-FM in Bancroft, Ontario
- CHOM-FM in Montreal, Quebec
- CHTZ-FM in St. Catharines, Ontario
- CHUP-FM in Calgary, Alberta
- CIDD-FM in Carlyle Lake Resort, Saskatchewan
- CIDO-FM in Creston, British Columbia
- CILE-FM-1 in Lac Allard, Quebec
- CILE-FM-2 in Riviere-au-Tonnerre, Quebec
- CKEN-FM in Kentville, Nova Scotia
- CKTK-FM in Kitimat, British Columbia
- VF2367 in Dillon, Saskatchewan
- VF2433 in Iqaluit, Nunavut

== China ==
- CNR The Voice of China in Qiqihar, Yantai and Zhangzhou
- Radio Enping in Enping, Jiangmen

== Malaysia ==
- Terengganu FM in Southern Terengganu
- Zayan in Kuching, Sarawak(?)

== Mexico ==
- XEEW-FM in Matamoros, Tamaulipas
- XERC-FM in Mexico City
- XHAAL-FM in Saltillo, Coahuila
- XHAL-FM in Manzanillo, Colima
- XHARE-FM in Meoqui, Chihuahua
- XHCSAK-FM in Matehuala, San Luis Potosi
- XHCSBJ-FM in Zihuatanejo, Guerrero
- XHESCC-FM in Sabinas, Coahuila
- XHESH-FM in Sabinas Hidalgo, Nuevo León
- XHGL-FM in Mérida, Yucatán
- XHGRC-FM in Acapulco, Guerrero
- XHGTC-FM in Tuxtla Gutiérrez, Chiapas
- XHHO-FM in Ciudad Obregón, Sonora
- XHLOS-FM in Montemorelos, Nuevo León
- XHNF-FM in Tepic, Nayarit
- XHOT-FM in Xalapa, Veracruz
- XHRPO-FM in Santa Cruz Amilpas, Oaxaca
- XHRW-FM in Tampico, Tamaulipas
- XHSEA-FM in Cananea, Sonora
- XHSNP-FM in San Luis Potosí, San Luis Potosí
- XHWO-FM in Chetumal, Quintana Roo
- XHWT-FM in Culiacán, Sinaloa
- XHZU-FM in Zacapu, Michoacán

== Philippines ==
- DZLT-FM in Tarlac
- DWFH in Dumaguete
- DXSR in Valencia, Bukidnon

== United Kingdom ==
- Radio X in Manchester

== United States (Channel 249) ==
- KACI in The Dalles, Oregon
- KALK in Winfield, Texas
- KAPB in Marksville, Louisiana
- KATX in Eastland, Texas
- KBBX in Nebraska City, Nebraska
- KCCH-LP in Helena, Montana
- KCNN in Benson, Arizona
- KCRR in Grundy Center, Iowa
- KCYA in Rolling Hills, Wyoming
- KCYI-LP in Oklahoma City, Oklahoma
- KCYP-LP in Mission, Texas
- KCYQ in Elsinore, Utah
- KDLC in Dulac, Louisiana
- KEQB in Coburg, Oregon
- KFGB-LP in Topeka, Kansas
- KGFZ in Burke, Texas
- KGLM in Anaconda, Montana
- KHBT in Humboldt, Iowa
- KHHZ in Gridley, California
- KHIA-LP in Brundage, Texas
- KHIM in Mangum, Oklahoma
- KHRK in Hennessey, Oklahoma
- KICM in Healdton, Oklahoma
- KJMR-LP in Chattaroy, Washington
- KJSM-FM in Augusta, Arkansas
- KKDS-LP in Eureka, California
- KKWL in Butte Falls, Oregon
- KLGR-FM in Redwood Falls, Minnesota
- KLVO (FM) in Belen, New Mexico
- KMTY in Gibbon, Nebraska
- KNBB in Dubach, Louisiana
- KNBZ in Redfield, South Dakota
- KNIU-LP in Kansas City, Kansas
- KNOZ in Orchard Mesa, Colorado
- KNWN-FM in Oakville, Washington
- KNZR-FM in Shafter, California
- KOGI-LP in Big Pine, California
- KOTM in Ottumwa, Iowa
- KPFF-LP in Pahrump, Nevada
- KPLS-FM in Strasburg, Colorado
- KPOW in La Monte, Missouri
- KQBS in Potosi, Missouri
- KQLW-LP in Lewistown, Montana
- KQMO in Shell Knob, Missouri
- KQQO-LP in Ogallala, Nebraska
- KQVO in Calexico, California
- KRGU-LP in Midwest City, Oklahoma
- KRIO in Roma, Texas
- KRWL-LP in Coquille, Oregon
- KRXD in McNary, Arizona
- KSNP (FM) in Burlington, Kansas
- KTAQ-LP in Sandpoint, Idaho
- KTPI in Mojave, California
- KVPW in Mecca, California
- KVRV in Monte Rio, California
- KWAI in Los Altos, California
- KWIN in Lodi, California
- KWNK-LP in Reno, Nevada
- KXJN in Moose Wilson Road, Wyoming
- KYRT in Mason, Texas
- KYSN in East Wenatchee, Washington
- KZAR in McQueeney, Texas
- KZBG in Lapwai, Idaho
- KZYR in Avon, Colorado
- WAFL (FM) in Milford, Delaware
- WAQE in Barron, Wisconsin
- WAVK in Marathon, Florida
- WAZK in Nantucket, Massachusetts
- WBCR-LP in Great Barrington, Massachusetts
- WCIG in Big Flats, New York
- WCJO in Jackson, Ohio
- WCLS in Spencer, Indiana
- WCTY in Norwich, Connecticut
- WCXU in Caribou, Maine
- WCZX in Hyde Park, New York
- WEXT in Amsterdam, New York
- WFBO-LP in Flagler Beach, Florida
- WFDL in Lomira, Wisconsin
- WGGN in Castalia, Ohio
- WGLR in Lancaster, Wisconsin
- WGMT in Lyndon, Vermont
- WGPB in Rome, Georgia
- WGTI in Winfall, North Carolina
- WHET in West Frankfort, Illinois
- WHZK-LP in Greenwood, South Carolina
- WILE-FM in Byesville, Ohio
- WJEV-LP in Dale City, Virginia
- WKCA in Salt Lick, Kentucky
- WKKR in Auburn, Alabama
- WKRP-FM in Mason, Ohio
- WKSH-LP in Shreveport, Louisiana
- WKXM in Winfield, Alabama
- WLER in Butler, Pennsylvania
- WLKH in Somerset, Pennsylvania
- WLQI in Rensselaer, Indiana
- WMCW-LP in Astor, Florida
- WMDM in Lexington Park, Maryland
- WMGZ in Eatonton, Georgia
- WMLQ in Manistee, Michigan
- WMOI in Monmouth, Illinois
- WMRX in Beaverton, Michigan
- WNLB-LP in Holland, Ohio
- WNSX in Winter Harbor, Maine
- WNVM in Cidra, Puerto Rico
- WOLV in Houghton, Michigan
- WQDC in Sturgeon Bay, Wisconsin
- WQLZ in Petersburg, Illinois
- WRBJ-FM in Brandon, Mississippi
- WREF in Sebree, Kentucky
- WRIC-FM in Richlands, Virginia
- WRYD in Jemison, Alabama
- WSNI in Swanzey, New Hampshire
- WSTQ (FM) in Streator, Illinois
- WTCQ in Vidalia, Georgia
- WTGN in Lima, Ohio
- WTGO-LP in Lafayette, Indiana
- WTGV-FM in Sandusky, Michigan
- WTLQ-FM in Punta Rassa, Florida
- WTTY in Ty Ty, Georgia
- WTYJ in Fayette, Mississippi
- WTYL-FM in Tylertown, Mississippi
- WVBB in Elliston-Lafayette, Virginia
- WVCU-LP in Athens, West Virginia
- WVRT in Mill Hall, Pennsylvania
- WWOC-LP in Bowling Green, Ohio
- WWPP-LP in Homestead, Florida
- WWSH-LP in Vero Beach, Florida
- WWUF in Waycross, Georgia
- WWXM in Garden City, South Carolina
- WYJJ in Trenton, Tennessee
- WYXX in Goshen, Indiana
- WYYX in Bonifay, Florida
- WZKT in Walnut Creek, North Carolina
- WZRM in Brockton, Massachusetts
- WZZN in Union Grove, Alabama
