= WKLO =

Coordinates: 38°28′21″N 86°24′39″W

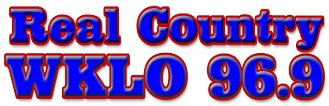
- Hardinsburg, Indiana; United States
- Broadcast area: Paoli, Indiana
- Frequency: 96.9 MHz
- Branding: Real Country

Programming
- Format: Country music
- Affiliations: Real Country (Westwood One)

Ownership
- Owner: Kelly Trask; (Diamond Shores Broadcasting, LLC)
- Sister stations: WUME-FM; WSEZ; WZZB; WXKU-FM

History
- First air date: 2002
- Call sign meaning: "Kentucky - Louisville" from the WKLO AM 1080 call-sign

Technical information
- Licensing authority: FCC
- Facility ID: 88536
- Class: A
- ERP: 3,500 watts
- HAAT: 132 meters (433 ft)

Links
- Public license information: Public file; LMS
- Webcast: Listen live
- Website: http://wklo969.com/

WKLO 96.9 FM is a radio station broadcasting a country music format. Licensed to Hardinsburg, Indiana, the station serves the Paoli area, and is owned by Kelly Trask, through licensee Diamond Shores Broadcasting. The call sign is evocative of WKLO, an influential Top 40 station in Louisville that used the call sign from 1948 to 1986.
