= WSJP =

WSJP may refer to:

- WSJP (AM), a radio station (1640 AM) licensed to Sussex, Wisconsin, United States
- WSJP-FM, a radio station (100.1 FM) licensed to Port Washington, Wisconsin, United States
- WSJP-LD, a television station (channel 18) licensed to Aquadilla, Puerto Rico, United States
- WBZB, a radio station (1130 AM) licensed to Murray, Kentucky, United States, which used the call sign WSJP from 1976 to 2000
