= 1560 AM =

AM radio frequency

The following radio stations broadcast on AM frequency 1560 kHz: 1560 AM is classified as a United States clear-channel frequency by the Federal Communications Commission. KNZR Bakersfield and WFME New York City share Class A status of 1560 kHz.

== Argentina ==
- LT 33 in 9 de Julio, Buenos Aires
- LT 11 in Concepción del Uruguay, Entre Rios
- Castañares in Ituzaingó
- La Voz in Tandil, Buenos Aires
- Restauración in Lavallol, Buenos Aires

== Mexico ==
- XEJPV-AM in Ciudad Juárez, Chihuahua
- XEMAS-AM in Salamanca, Guanajuato

== United States ==
Stations in bold are clear-channel stations.

| Call sign | City of license | Facility ID | Class | Daytime power (kW) | Nighttime power (kW) | Critical hours power (kW) | Transmitter coordinates |
|---|---|---|---|---|---|---|---|
| KABI | Abilene, Kansas | 18054 | D | 0.25 | 0.058 | | 38.929444°N 97.246111°W |
| KBEW | Blue Earth, Minnesota | 33650 | D | 1 | | | 43.645556°N 94.0925°W |
| KEBC | Del City, Oklahoma | 6747 | B | 1 | 0.25 | | 35.440556°N 97.49°W (daytime); 35.440833°N 97.49°W (nighttime) |
| KGOW | Bellaire, Texas | 17389 | B | 46 | 15 | | 29.326944°N 95.55°W (daytime); 29.901389°N 95.804167°W (nighttime) |
| KHBR | Hillsboro, Texas | 34524 | D | 0.25 | | | 32.015833°N 97.109167°W |
| KIQS | Willows, California | 34941 | D | 0.25 | | | 39.528889°N 122.169167°W |
| KLNG | Council Bluffs, Iowa | 72464 | D | 10 | | 2.1 | 41.207778°N 95.906667°W |
| KLTI | Macon, Missouri | 43535 | D | 1 | 0.041 | | 39.709444°N 92.463889°W |
| **KNZR** | Bakersfield, California | 7715 | A | 25 | 10 | | 35.308333°N 119.046111°W |
| KTUI | Sullivan, Missouri | 41171 | D | 1 | 0.025 | | 38.195°N 91.186667°W |
| KTXZ | West Lake Hills, Texas | 59278 | B | 2.5 | 2.5 | | 30.360556°N 97.653056°W |
| KVAN | Burbank, Washington | 132714 | B | 10 | 0.7 | | 46.169722°N 119.025556°W |
| KZIZ | Pacific, Washington | 35550 | B | 5 | 0.9 | 3.3 | 47.236111°N 122.228889°W |
| KZQQ | Abilene, Texas | 17803 | D | 0.5 | 0.045 | | 32.455833°N 99.799722°W |
| WAHT | Cowpens, South Carolina | 24482 | D | 15 | | 0.87 | 34.959444°N 81.809722°W |
| WBOL | Bolivar, Tennessee | 60029 | D | 0.25 | | | 35.258333°N 88.980556°W |
| WBYM | Bayamon, Puerto Rico | 295 | B | 4 | 0.74 | | 18.349722°N 66.157222°W |
| WBYS | Canton, Illinois | 22898 | D | 0.25 | 0.018 | | 40.544444°N 90.020833°W |
| **WFME** | New York, New York | 29024 | A | 50 | 50 | | 40.716667°N 73.917778°W |
| WFSP | Kingwood, West Virginia | 70624 | D | 1 | | 0.25 | 39.480556°N 79.719722°W |
| WGLB | Elm Grove, Wisconsin | 73050 | B | 2.5 | 0.25 | 0.7 | 43.008889°N 88.035°W |
| WKDO | Liberty, Kentucky | 8993 | D | 1 | | | 37.306111°N 84.917222°W |
| WLZR | Melbourne, Florida | 60388 | D | 5 | | | 28.127778°N 80.708056°W |
| WMBH | Joplin, Missouri | 72493 | D | 0.5 | 0.035 | | 37.089167°N 94.562778°W |
| WPAD | Paducah, Kentucky | 54720 | D | 1 | 0.035 | | 37.052222°N 88.600833°W |
| WRIN | Rensselaer, Indiana | 7308 | D | 1 | | 0.5 | 40.961389°N 87.151944°W |
| WSBV | South Boston, Virginia | 64646 | D | 2.5 | | 0.25 | 36.709722°N 78.874444°W |
| WSEZ | Paoli, Indiana | 28601 | D | 0.25 | | | 38.538056°N 86.478889°W |
| WSLA | Slidell, Louisiana | 39849 | D | 1 | | | 30.252222°N 89.762778°W |
| WTNS | Coshocton, Ohio | 13981 | D | 1 | | | 40.275°N 81.826944°W |
| WWYC | Toledo, Ohio | 22672 | D | 1 | 0.003 | 0.92 | 41.616667°N 83.621389°W |
| WYZD | Dobson, North Carolina | 17047 | D | 4.2 | | 0.51 | 36.3925°N 80.733333°W |
