= WKSH =

WKSH may refer to:

- WKSH-LP, a low-power radio station (97.7 FM) licensed to serve Shreveport, Louisiana, United States
- WSJP (AM), a radio station (1640 AM) licensed to serve Sussex, Wisconsin, United States, which held the call sign WKSH from 1998 to 2014
