= Chuck Morse (journalist) =

American journalist

- Born: February 23, 1957 (age 69); Quincy, Massachusetts
- Occupations: Journalist, author, radio talk show host
- Website: https://chuck-morse-speaks.podomatic.com

Chuck Morse is a conservative American journalist, author and radio talk show host from Boston, Massachusetts.

In 2004, Morse ran an independent campaign in Massachusetts's 4th congressional district against incumbent Barney Frank. He lost 78-22%. Two years later, Morse ran a write-in campaign against Barney Frank for the 2006 election, as he did not get enough certified signatures to appear on the ballot. The total possible percentage of votes Morse could have received as a write-in candidate in the 2006 election would be 1.2% of the total vote.

Morse opposed Frank's 1990 amendment to the Immigration and Nationality Act, which barred immigrants being denied visas "because of any past, current, or expected beliefs, statements, or associations which, if engaged in by a United States citizen in the United States, would be protected under the Constitution of the United States." Morse claimed that this legislation made it easier for the terrorists who carried out the September 11, 2001 attacks to enter the country.

Morse was awarded the National Right to Work Foundation's Right to Work Communication Fellowship Award in 2003, which is given to a "journalist who has done a great deal to communicate to the public about the struggle against union tyranny and abuse encountered by America's working men and women."

Morse, who attended Harvard University Extension School, described himself as a former left-wing radical who became a conservative after filing his first tax return as a self-employed businessman. His columns have appeared in The Boston Globe, The Washington Times, WorldNetDaily, Newsmax and FrontPage Magazine. Morse was named to the list of Heavy 100 Radio Talk Show Hosts by Talkers Magazine, and as the National Right to Work Committee Communicator of the Year in 2003. He said: "My guests have included over the years such diverse thinkers as Pat Buchanan, Jack Kemp, Pete Peterson, Caspar Weinberger, Noam Chomsky, Howard Zinn, Gloria Steinem, Alan Dershowitz and Geraldo Riviera. I thrive on vigorous political debate, the type of conversations that leave my audience with something to think about and discuss around the water cooler."

Radio stations that carry Chuck Morse Speaks:

- KNUJ AM Mankato MN
- KOBE AM El Paso TX
- KSWM AM Springfield MO
- WCST AM Washington DC
- WGEA AM Dothan AL
- WLDY AM La Crosse WI

== Works ==
- Chuck Morse (1 August 2010). The Nazi Connection to Islamic Terrorism: Adolf Hitler and Haj Amin Al-Husseini. WND Books. ISBN 978-1935071037.
- Chuck Morse (June 2005). Barney Frank and the Law of Unintended Consequences: How the Frank Amendment Helped Terrorists Get Legal Visas. iUniverse. ISBN 978-0-595-35948-6.
