= WZRK =

WZRK may refer to:

- WZRK (AM), a radio station (810 AM) licensed to serve Dodgeville, Wisconsin, United States
- WZRK (Lake Geneva, Wisconsin), a defunct radio station (1550 AM) formerly licensed to serve Lake Geneva, Wisconsin
- WBDL-LD, a low-power television station (channel 18, virtual 8) licensed to serve Elk Mound, Wisconsin, which held the call sign WZRK-LP in 2017
