= WPJP =

WPJP may refer to:

- WPJP-LP, a low-power radio station (100.7 FM) licensed to serve Madisonville, Kentucky, United States
- WSJP-FM, a radio station (100.1 FM) licensed to serve Port Washington, Wisconsin, United States, which held the call sign WPJP from 2003 to 2014
