= KWNK =

KWNK may refer to:

- KWNK-FM, a radio station (89.7 FM) licensed to serve Tahoma, California, United States
- KWNK-LP, a low-power radio station (97.7 FM) licensed to serve Reno, Nevada, United States
- KIRN, a radio station (670 AM) licensed to serve Simi Valley, California, United States, which held the call sign KWNK from 1983 to 1997
