= KJSM =

KJSM may refer to:

- KJSM-FM, a radio station (97.7 FM) licensed to serve Augusta, Arkansas, United States
- KJSM-LP, a defunct low-power radio station (97.1 FM) formerly licensed to serve Yucca Valley, California, United States
