= DZLT =

DZLT may refer to:

- DZLT-AM, an AM radio station broadcasting in Lucena, branded as Radyo Pilipino
- DZLT-FM, an FM radio station broadcasting in Tarlac City, branded as Love Radio
