= WSEZ (disambiguation) =

WSEZ is a radio station (1560 AM) licensed to Paoli, Indiana.

WSEZ may also refer to:

- Wałbrzych Special Economic Zone, a special economic zone in Wałbrzych, Poland
- WPAW, a radio station (93.1 FM) licensed to Greensboro, North Carolina, which held the call sign WSEZ from 1979 to 1987
