= XHZU-FM =

Radio station in Zacapu, Michoacán

- Zacapu, Michoacán; Mexico
- Frequency: 97.7 FM
- Branding: Candela

Programming
- Format: Regional Mexican

Ownership
- Owner: Cadena RASA; (Promotores de Radio, S.A.)

History
- First air date: July 26, 1950 (concession)
- Call sign meaning: First and last letters of Zacapu

Technical information
- ERP: 6 kW
- Transmitter coordinates: 19°48′50.2″N 101°47′53.6″W

Links
- Website: cadenarasa.com/michoacan/zacapu/candela

XHZU-FM is a radio station on 97.7 FM in Zacapu, Michoacán. It is owned by Cadena RASA and carries a Regional Mexican format known as Candela.

== History ==
XEZU-AM received its concession on July 26, 1950. It broadcast with 1,000 watts on 1270 kHz. By the 1980s, daytime power had been cut to 500 watts.

In the 1990s, XEZU was moved to 930 kHz and raised its power to 1 kW.

XEZU received approval to migrate to FM in 2012 as XHZT-FM on 97.7.
