= XHAAL-FM =

Cultural radio station in Saltillo, Coahuila

- Saltillo, Coahuila; Mexico
- Broadcast area: Saltillo, Coahuila
- Frequency: 97.7 FM
- Branding: Radio Concierto

Programming
- Format: Cultural

Ownership
- Owner: Armando Sergio Fuentes Aguirre

History
- First air date: January 1997; December 19, 2012 (current permit)

Technical information
- Licensing authority: CRT
- Class: A
- ERP: 2.85 kW
- HAAT: −222 m (−728 ft)
- Transmitter coordinates: 25°25′03.9″N 100°59′58.3″W

Links
- Website: www.radioconcierto.org.mx

XHAAL-FM is a noncommercial radio station on 97.7 FM in Saltillo, Coahuila. The station is owned by Armando Sergio Fuentes Aguirre and is known as Radio Concierto with a cultural format.

== History ==
XHAAL received its most recent permit on December 19, 2012, though its history dates to the 1990s. The station formally launched on February 27, 1997 after beginning programs in January, and President Ernesto Zedillo delivered a speech at the station's inauguration ceremony.
