= KSWM =

Coordinates: 36°59′39″N 93°42′58″W

- Aurora, Missouri; United States
- Broadcast area: Springfield, Missouri
- Frequency: 940 kHz
- Branding: Boomer Radio 940 AM

Programming
- Format: News Talk Information

Ownership
- Owner: Falcon Broadcasting
- Sister stations: KRMO KKBL KQMO

Technical information
- Facility ID: 167
- Class: D
- Power: 1,000 watts day 38 watts night

KSWM (940 AM) is a radio station broadcasting a News Talk Information format. Licensed to Aurora, Missouri, United States, it serves the Springfield MO area. The station is currently owned by Falcon Broadcasting.

== History ==
KSWM began broadcasting in 1961. It was owned and operated by Galen O. Gilbert, a long-time radio station owner. At the time, Gilbert also owned KBTN-AM, in nearby Neosho, Missouri. At first, KSWM broadcast from a storefront location on Locust Street in Aurora. However, in the mid-1960s, plans were underway to build a companion FM station and a new studio building at the corner of Locust and Jefferson Streets. KSWM-AM and its new FM station (KSWM-FM) began broadcasting from the new building 1967. KSWM-AM continues to broadcast from this studio today, even though the FM stations have gone through many changes.

In the 1960s and 1970s, the station was managed by Joe McCullah, who wore many hats at the station. McCullah was perhaps best remember for his "Revolving Bandstand" program, which played the Top40 "Rock N Roll" hits of the day. The station was also known for a "Quiz Bowl" competition between local high school teams, similar to TV's College Bowl program. Other well known members of the staff during that era were Everett Archer, Ralph Lynch, Randy Estes and a very young Les Sweckerd, who would change his name to "Les Garland" and go on be a part of the formative group of MTV.

Around 1980, the station was sold to a group of local businessmen, and then to Dale Hendrix, who attempted to upgrade the station to 5,000 watts and move the transmitter site to near Republic, Missouri. Both of those efforts failed, however Hendrix did upgrade the companion FM station (KELE) to 50,000 watts and sold it to Sunburst Media, and it became KGMY-FM ("My Country") operated from Springfield, Missouri. (now KSWF, owned by iHeartMedia)

In 1991, Hendrix turned KSWM-AM back over to Galen Gilbert. The station was off-the-air at that time. Gilbert put the station back on the air and try to bring it back to profitability. In August 1991, KSWM returned to the air as a stand-alone AM station from the studios at Locust & Jefferson. Art Morris was the manager and morning host. Kelly Ellison as sales manager and air talent, Kris Inman as air talent and sports director, Mariah McKinley as traffic director and air talent. These formed a core-group of people that helped to return KSWM to the air. Since the station had been off-the-air for several months, the first goal was to bring back the audience. Local news, weather and sports as well as the "Trading Post" program would help reestablish the audience. Within five years, the station was successful again.

In 1993, a companion FM station was built. KELE-FM (106.7 licensed to Mt. Vernon, Missouri) was eventually sold to Radio 2000, Inc. and became KHTO, and later KRVI ("The River") currently owned by Summit Media, Inc and is operated from Springfield, Missouri.

Another companion FM station was built in 1999. KQMO-FM (97.7, licensed to Shell Knob, Missouri) is currently broadcasting Spanish programming.

In 2003, Gilbert signed a contract with Dewayne & Janet Gandy and Bill Lewis (operating as "Falcon Broadcasting") to purchase the station and its companion FM (KQMO). Gandys and Lewis had purchased KRMO and KKBL in nearby Monett, MO a year or so earlier. They combined operations of all four stations (KSWM-AM, KRMO-AM, KKBL-FM and KQMO-FM) in the KSWM studio building on South Jefferson Street in Aurora.
