= WZRK (Lake Geneva, Wisconsin) =

Radio station in Lake Geneva, Wisconsin, United States (1964–2015)

- Lake Geneva, Wisconsin; United States
- Frequency: 1550 kHz

Programming
- Format: Defunct

History
- First air date: May 15, 1964 (as WMIR)
- Last air date: January 2015
- Former call signs: WMIR (1964–1996); WAUX (1996–2001)

Technical information
- Facility ID: 61389
- Class: D
- Power: 1,000 watts day; 1 watt night
- Transmitter coordinates: 42°35′39.00″N 88°23′24.00″W

WZRK (1550 AM) was a radio station licensed to Lake Geneva, Wisconsin, United States. Its studio and transmitter were located on State Highway 50 east of Lake Geneva. The station ran 1,000 watts during daytime hours, with a two tower array and a directional pattern to the east and west. Prior to being taken off the air, nighttime operations were added, running 1 watt.

== History ==
The station began broadcasting on May 15, 1964, and held the call sign WMIR. The station's call sign was based on the name of its president and co-owner Miriam Monroe.

The station went in a couple of formats for the first three decades. First middle-of-the-road in the 1970s, and then adult contemporary from 1983 until August 28, 1991. On that day, the station switched to News/Talk. Four years later in 1995, WMIR was sold to Walt-West Wisconsin for $120,000. The station dropped its news/talk format and adopted a sports format in January 1996 (as it first announced in October 1995), and its call letters were changed to WAUX as a simulcast of Waukesha's AM 1510 WAUK.

In 2001, the station was sold to Starboard Broadcasting. On November 12, 2001, the station's call sign was changed to WZRK. The station was silent in 2001 and 2002. The station was one of the original affiliates of the Catholic talk network, Relevant Radio, when it was launched in 2003. In 2008, the station's license was transferred to Sovereign City Radio Services. The station was silent for a period in 2008 and 2009.

In October 2009, the station began airing the Timeless Cool format, featuring a mix of jazz, blues and adult contemporary music, and was branded "Avenue 1550".

In 2009, Sovereign City Radio and Nelson Multimedia formed GS Radio of IL, and ownership of WZRK was transferred to this company. In November 2010, WZRK was granted a Federal Communications Commission construction permit to change its city of license to Northbrook, Illinois with a power of 1,500 watts nondirectional daytime only. Nelson Multimedia's WCSJ in Morris, Illinois would have surrendered its license in order for WZRK to move to Northbrook. However, this construction permit expired and no action was ever taken.

The station was silent throughout much of 2012, 2013, and 2014. In October 2014, WGLB, LLC., owner of WGLB in Elm Grove, Wisconsin, purchased WZRK for $100,000. In January 2015, WGLB, LLC requested the FCC cancel WZRK's license. This allowed for 1560 WGLB to increase its daytime power.
