= 2004 United States House of Representatives elections in Massachusetts =

- November 2, 2004

All 10 Massachusetts seats in the United States House of Representatives
	Majority party	Minority party
Party	Democratic	Republican
Last election	10	0
Seats won	10	0
Seat change	Steady	Steady
Popular vote	2,059,984	435,239
Percentage	79.81%	16.86%
- Democratic 60–70% 70–80% 90>%

The 2004 congressional elections in Massachusetts was held on November 2, 2004, to determine who would represent the state of Massachusetts in the United States House of Representatives. Massachusetts had ten seats in the House, apportioned according to the 2000 United States census. Representatives are elected for two-year terms; those elected were served in the 109th Congress from January 3, 2005 until January 3, 2007.

== Overview ==
United States House of Representatives elections in Massachusetts, 2004
Party	Votes	Percentage	Seats	+/–
Democratic	2,059,984	79.81%	10	—
Republican	435,239	16.86%	0	—
Independents	85,732	3.32%	0	—
Totals	2,580,955	100.00%	10	—

== District 1 ==
2004 Massachusetts's 1st congressional district election
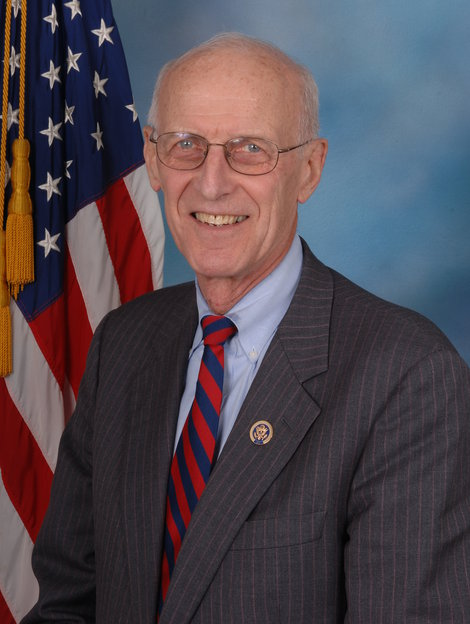
Nominee	John Olver
Party	Democratic
Popular vote	229,465
Percentage	99.0%
U.S. Representative before election
John Olver (inc.)
Democratic
Elected U.S. Representative
John Olver
Democratic

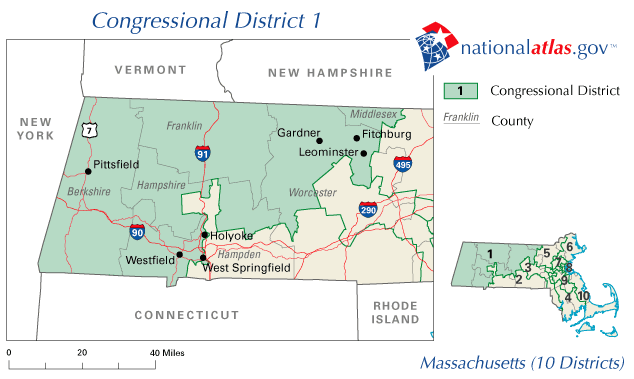

Incumbent Democratic Congressman John Olver ran for an eighth term in this staunchly Democratic district rooted in western Massachusetts. Facing no opponents in the general election, Olver was overwhelmingly re-elected to another term. Steven Adam ran as a write-in for the Republican nomination, but did not receive enough votes to make the general election ballot.

=== Predictions ===
Source	Ranking	As of
The Cook Political Report	Safe D	October 29, 2004
Sabato's Crystal Ball	Safe D	November 1, 2004

=== Results ===
Massachusetts's 1st congressional district election, 2004
Party	Candidate	Votes	%
Democratic	John Olver (inc.)	229,465	99.02
Write-ins		2,282	0.98
Total votes		231,747	100.00
Democratic hold			

== District 2 ==
2004 Massachusetts's 2nd congressional district election
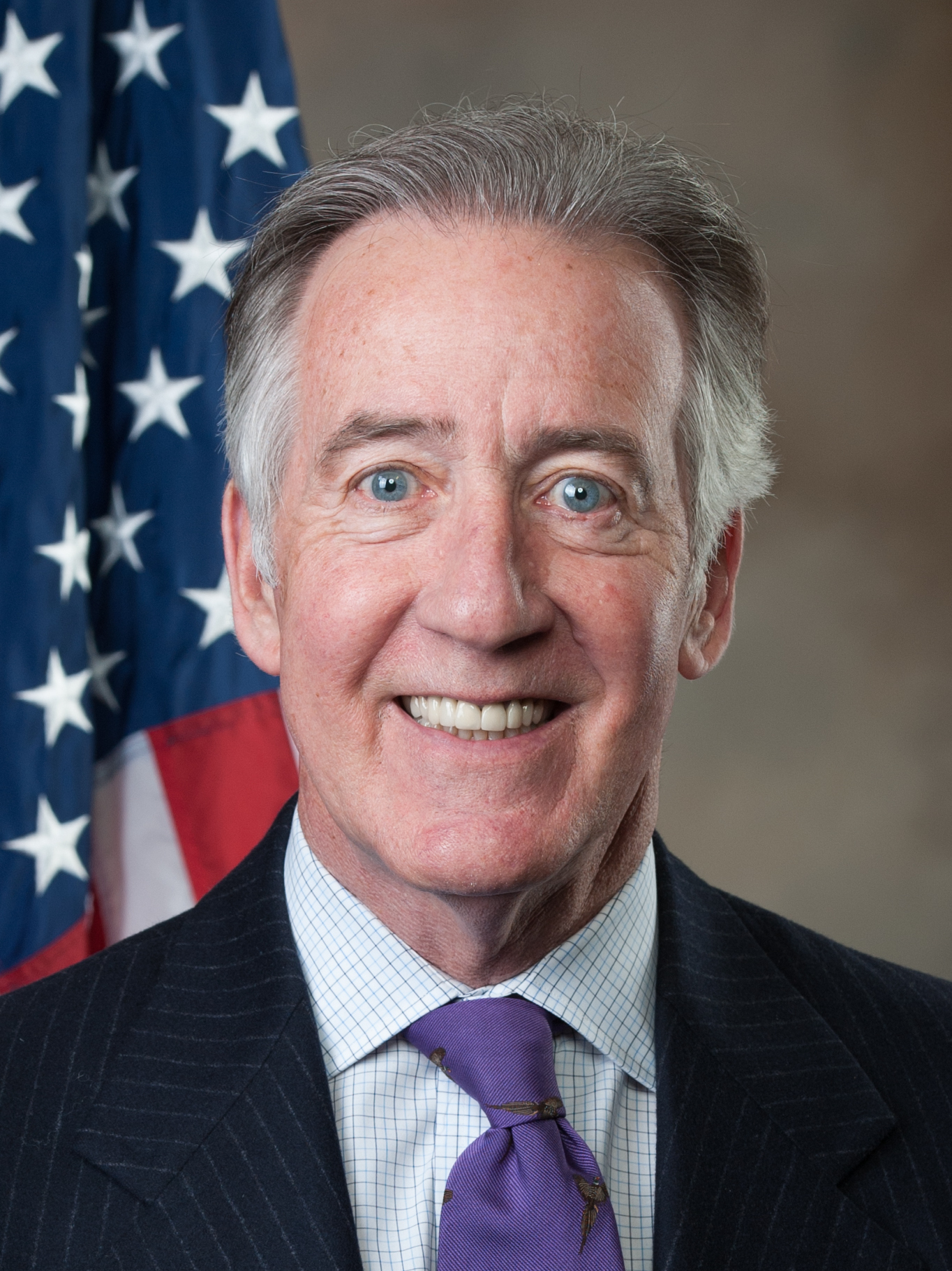
Nominee	Richard Neal
Party	Democratic
Popular vote	217,682
Percentage	98.7%
U.S. Representative before election
Richard Neal (inc.)
Democratic
Elected U.S. Representative
Richard Neal
Democratic

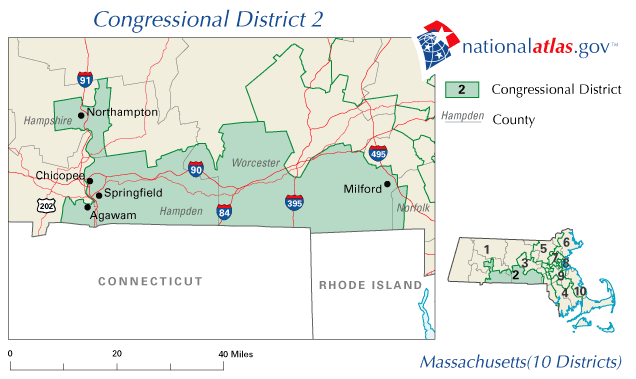

This south-central Massachusetts-based district has a strong tendency to elect Democratic candidates, and this year proved no different. When incumbent Democratic Congressman Richard Neal ran for a ninth term, he faced no opposition and coasted to re-election.

=== Predictions ===
Source	Ranking	As of
The Cook Political Report	Safe D	October 29, 2004
Sabato's Crystal Ball	Safe D	November 1, 2004

=== Results ===
Massachusetts's 2nd congressional district election, 2004
Party	Candidate	Votes	%
Democratic	Richard Neal (inc.)	217,682	98.73
Write-ins		2,802	1.27
Total votes		220,484	100.00
Democratic hold			

== District 3 ==
2004 Massachusetts's 3rd congressional district election
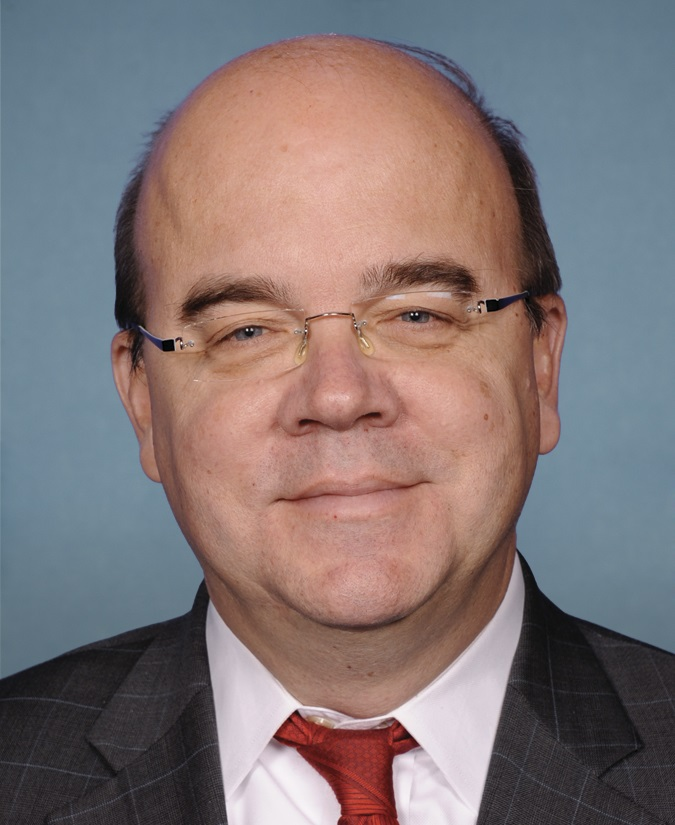

Nominee	Jim McGovern	Ronald A. Crews
Party	Democratic	Republican
Popular vote	192,036	80,197
Percentage	70.5%	29.4%
- County results Mcgovern: 60–70% 70–80%
U.S. Representative before election
Jim McGovern
Democratic
Elected U.S. Representative
Jim McGovern
Democratic

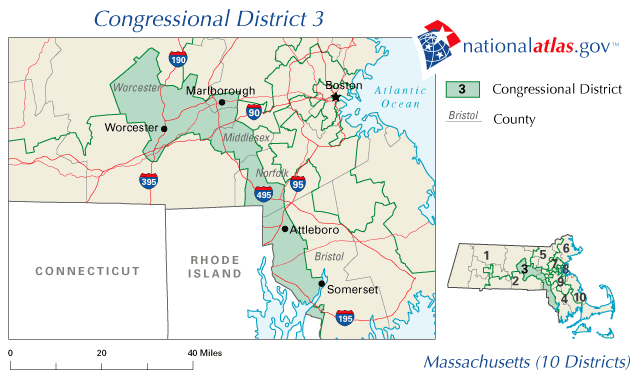

Incumbent Democratic Congressman Jim McGovern faced a challenge from Republican candidate Ronald Crews. This historically liberal district, which stretches from the western suburbs of Boston to the Massachusetts-Rhode Island border, has sent Congressman McGovern back to Congress with overwhelming margins of victory. This year proved to be no different, and McGovern crushed Crews to win a fifth term.

=== Predictions ===
Source	Ranking	As of
The Cook Political Report	Safe D	October 29, 2004
Sabato's Crystal Ball	Safe D	November 1, 2004

=== Results ===
Massachusetts's 3rd congressional district election, 2004
Party	Candidate	Votes	%
Democratic	Jim McGovern (inc.)	192,036	70.49
Republican	Ronald A. Crews	80,197	29.44
Write-ins		179	0.07
Total votes		272,412	100.00
Democratic hold			

== District 4 ==
2004 Massachusetts's 4th congressional district election
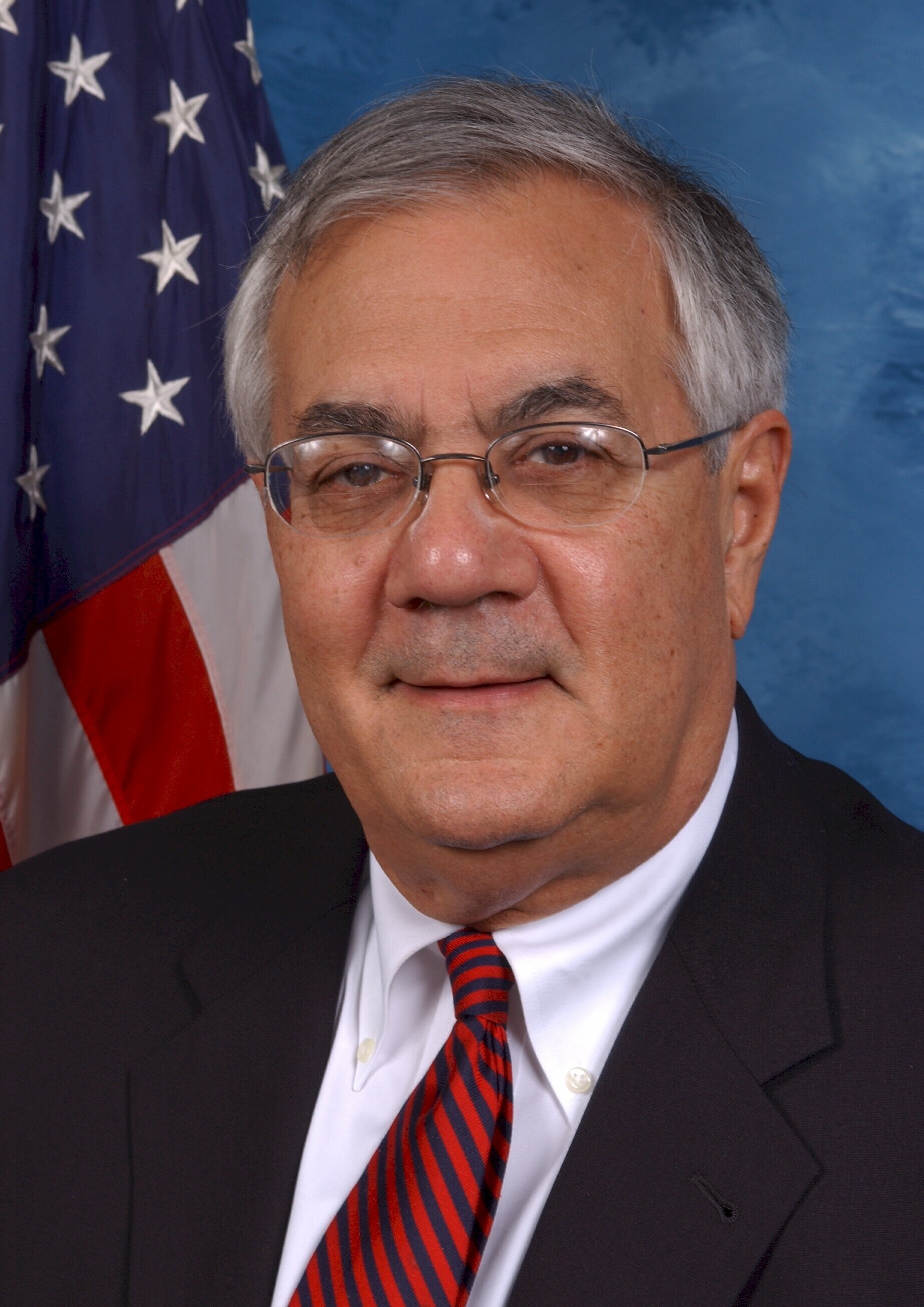

Nominee	Barney Frank	Chuck Morse
Party	Democratic	Independent
Popular vote	219,260	62,293
Percentage	77.7%	22.1%
- County results Frank: 60–70% 70–80% 80–90%
U.S. Representative before election
Barney Frank
Democratic
Elected U.S. Representative
Barney Frank
Democratic

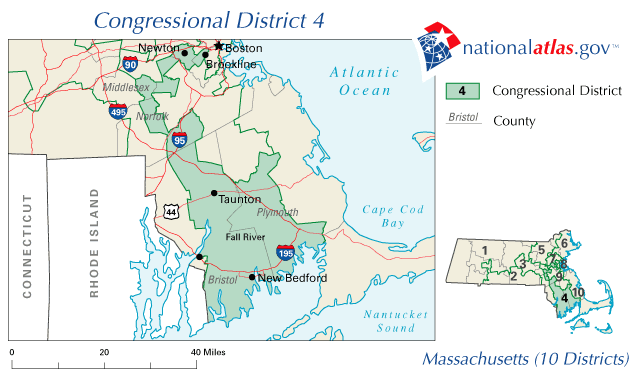

Congressman Barney Frank, a Democrat, has represented this strongly liberal district, which extends from Quincy to the South Coast, since he was initially elected in 1980. In 2004, Congressman Frank faced a challenge from independent candidate Chuck Morse, whom he was able to defeat by a wide margin.

=== Predictions ===
Source	Ranking	As of
The Cook Political Report	Safe D	October 29, 2004
Sabato's Crystal Ball	Safe D	November 1, 2004

=== Results ===
Massachusetts's 4th congressional district election, 2004
Party	Candidate	Votes	%
Democratic	Barney Frank (inc.)	219,260	77.74
Independent	Chuck Morse	62,293	22.09
Write-ins		486	0.17
Total votes		282,039	100.00
Democratic hold			

== District 5 ==
2004 Massachusetts's 5th congressional district election
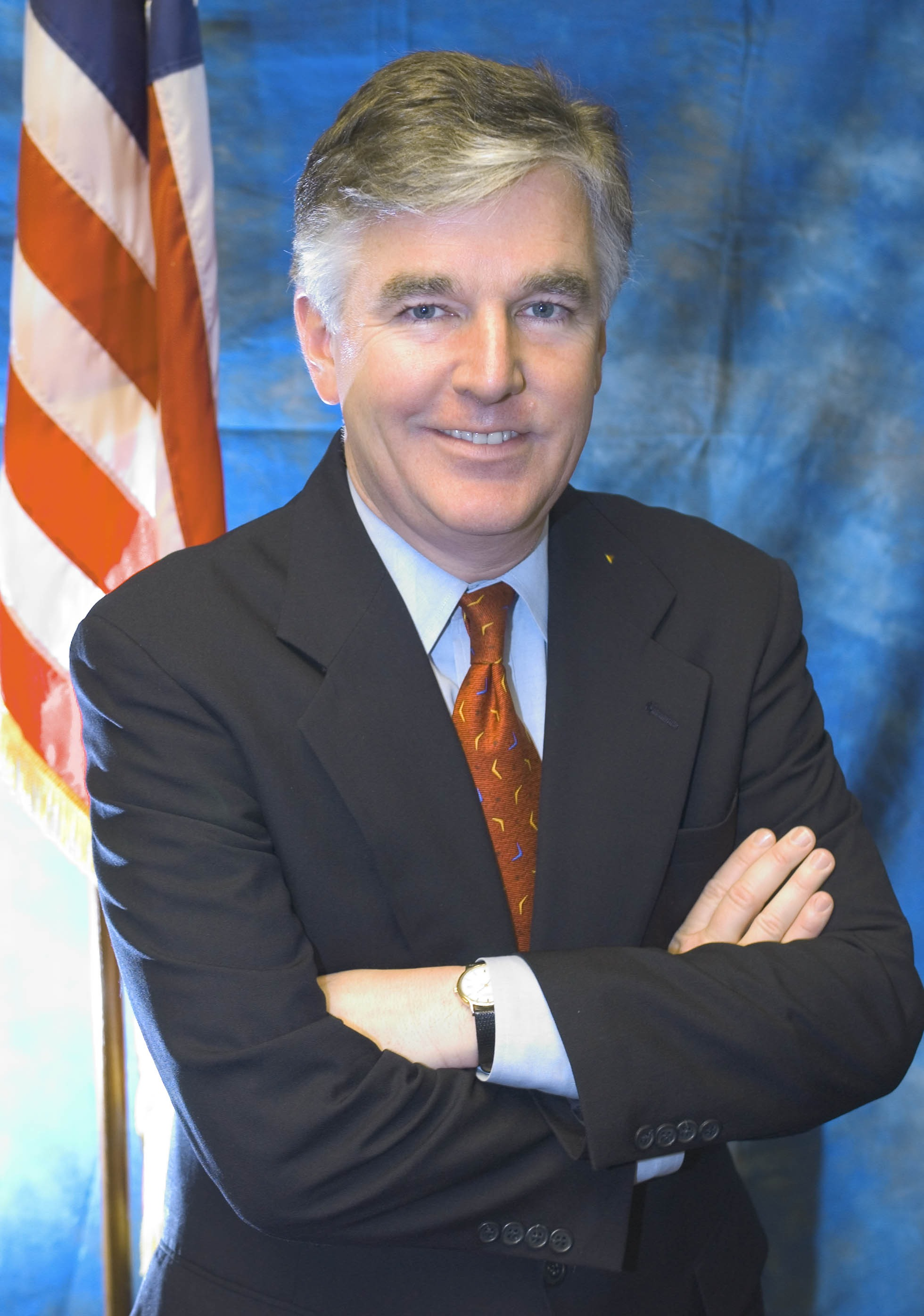

Nominee	Marty Meehan	Thomas P. Tierney
Party	Democratic	Republican
Popular vote	179,652	88,232
Percentage	67.0%	32.9%
- County results Meehan: 50–60% 60–70%
U.S. Representative before election
Marty Meehan (inc.)
Democratic
Elected U.S. Representative
Marty Meehan
Democratic

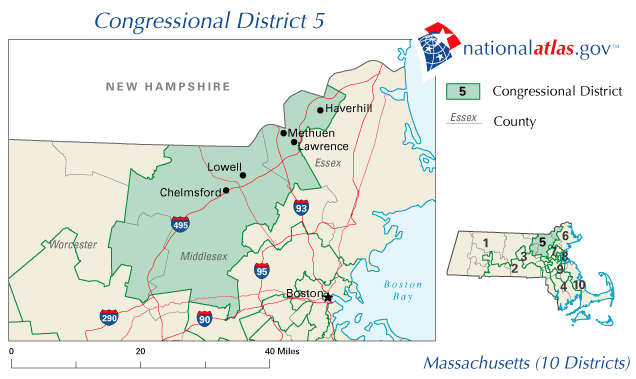

This liberal district rooted in the northern and eastern suburbs of Boston has been represented by Congressman Marty Meehan since he was first elected in 1992. This year, Congressman Meehan faced a challenge from Republican Thomas Tierney, but the Congressman won a seventh term.

=== Predictions ===
Source	Ranking	As of
The Cook Political Report	Safe D	October 29, 2004
Sabato's Crystal Ball	Safe D	November 1, 2004

=== Results ===
Massachusetts's 5th congressional district election, 2004
Party	Candidate	Votes	%
Democratic	Marty Meehan (incumbent)	179,652	66.99
Republican	Thomas P. Tierney	88,232	32.90
Write-ins		305	0.11
Total votes		268,189	100.00
Democratic hold			

== District 6 ==
2004 Massachusetts's 6th congressional district election
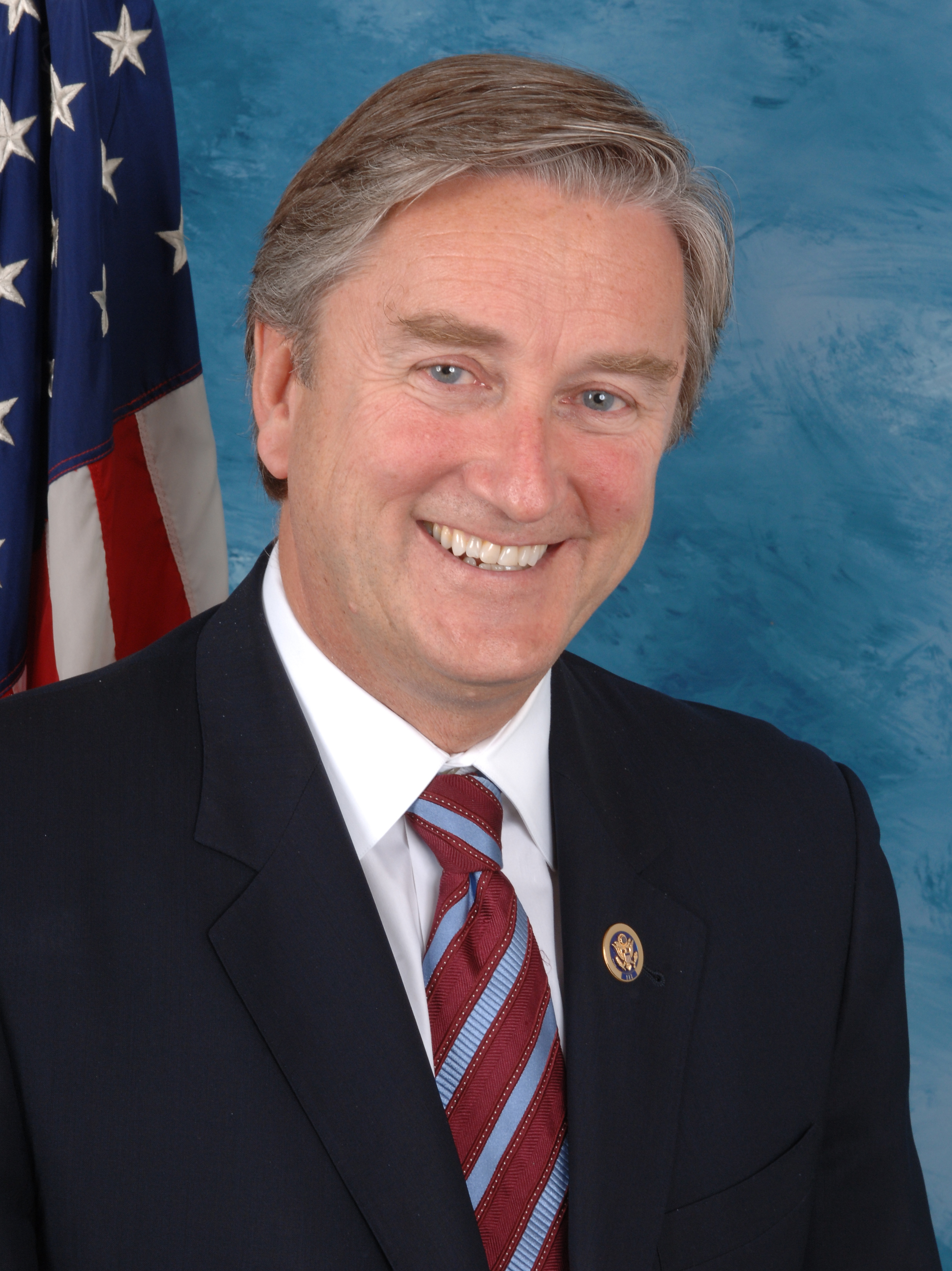

Nominee	John Tierney	Stephen P. O’Malley, Jr.
Party	Democratic	Republican
Popular vote	213,458	91,567
Percentage	69.9%	30.0%
- Municipality results Tierney: 50–60% 60–70% 70–80% 80–90%
U.S. Representative before election
John Tierney (inc.)
Democratic
Elected U.S. Representative
John Tierney
Democratic

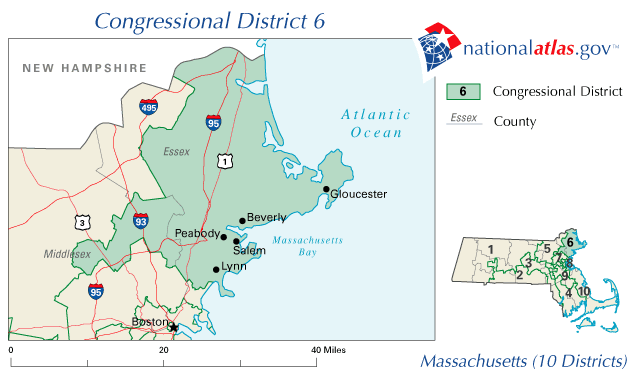

This district, which covers some of the northern suburbs of Boston and the far northeastern portion of the commonwealth, has been represented by Democratic Congressman John Tierney for eight years. In his quest for a fifth term, Tierney was opposed by Republican Stephen O'Malley, but he was re-elected in a landslide.

=== Predictions ===
Source	Ranking	As of
The Cook Political Report	Safe D	October 29, 2004
Sabato's Crystal Ball	Safe D	November 1, 2004

=== Results ===
Massachusetts's 6th congressional district election, 2004
Party	Candidate	Votes	%
Democratic	John Tierney (inc.)	213,458	69.87
Republican	Stephen P. O’Malley, Jr.	91,567	29.98
Write-ins		467	0.15
Total votes		305,522	100.00
Democratic hold			

== District 7 ==
2004 Massachusetts's 7th congressional district election
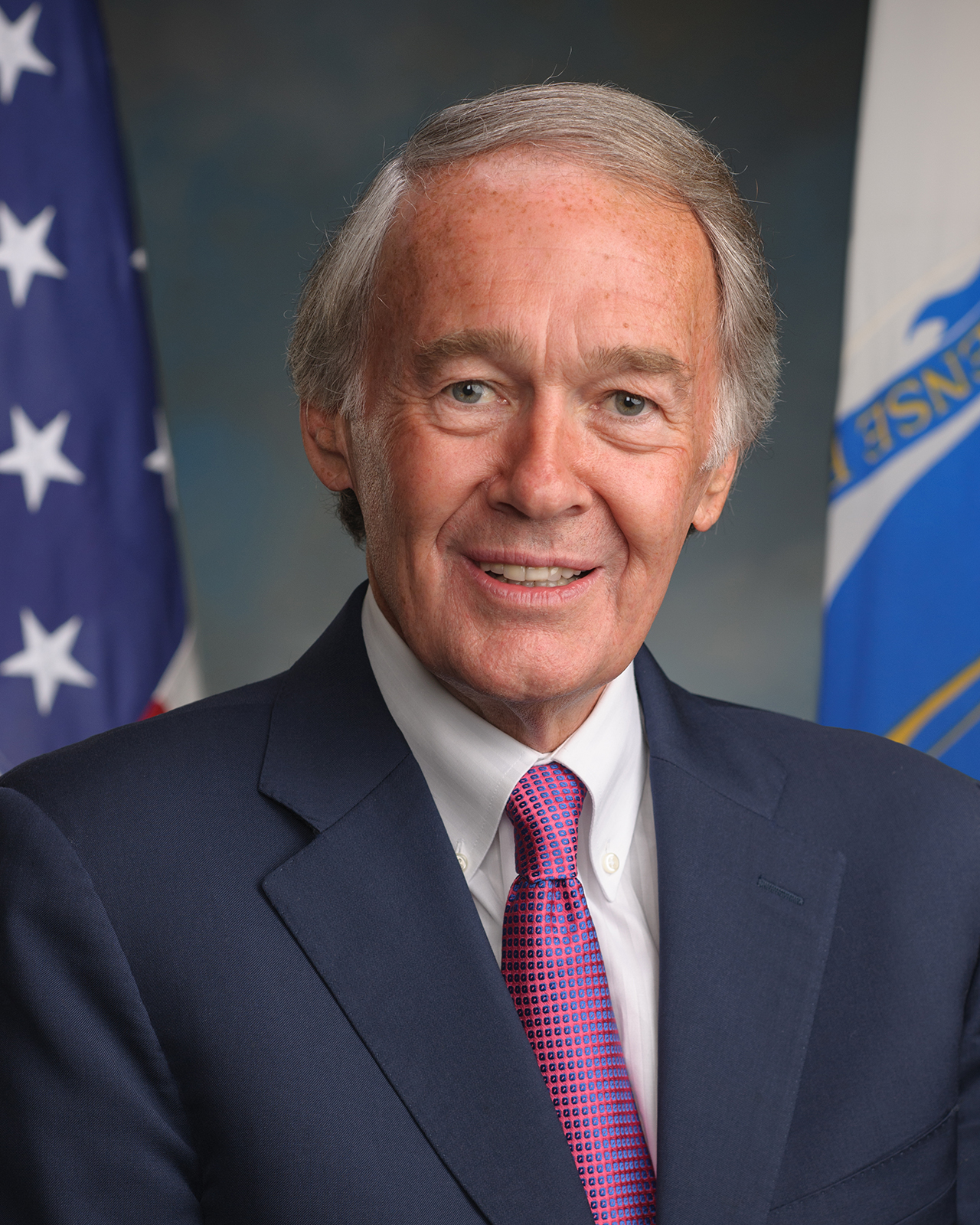

Nominee	Ed Markey	Kenneth Chase
Party	Democratic	Republican
Popular vote	202,399	60,334
Percentage	73.6%	21.9%
- County results Markey: 70–80%
U.S. Representative before election
Ed Markey (inc.)
Democratic
Elected U.S. Representative
Ed Markey
Democratic

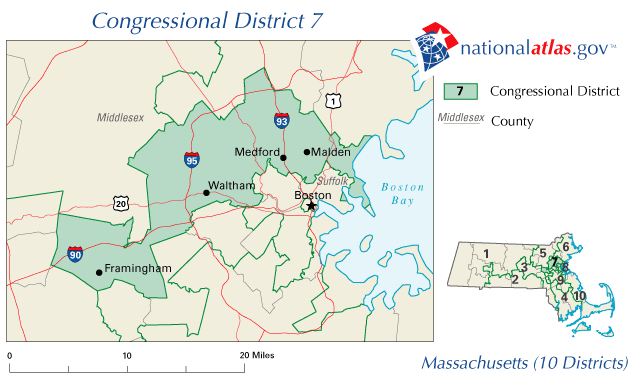

The predominantly liberal voter base from this district, based primarily in the northern and eastern Boston suburbs, have continually re-elected Democratic Congressman Ed Markey by large margins. This year, Congressman Markey ran against Republican challenger Kenneth Chase, winning in a land-slide.

=== Predictions ===
Source	Ranking	As of
The Cook Political Report	Safe D	October 29, 2004
Sabato's Crystal Ball	Safe D	November 1, 2004

=== Results ===
Massachusetts's 7th congressional district election, 2004
Party	Candidate	Votes	%
Democratic	Ed Markey (inc.)	202,399	73.57
Republican	Kenneth Chase	60,334	21.93
Independent	James O. Hall	12,139	4.41
Write-ins		227	0.08
Total votes		275,099	100.00
Democratic hold			

== District 8 ==
2004 Massachusetts's 8th congressional district election
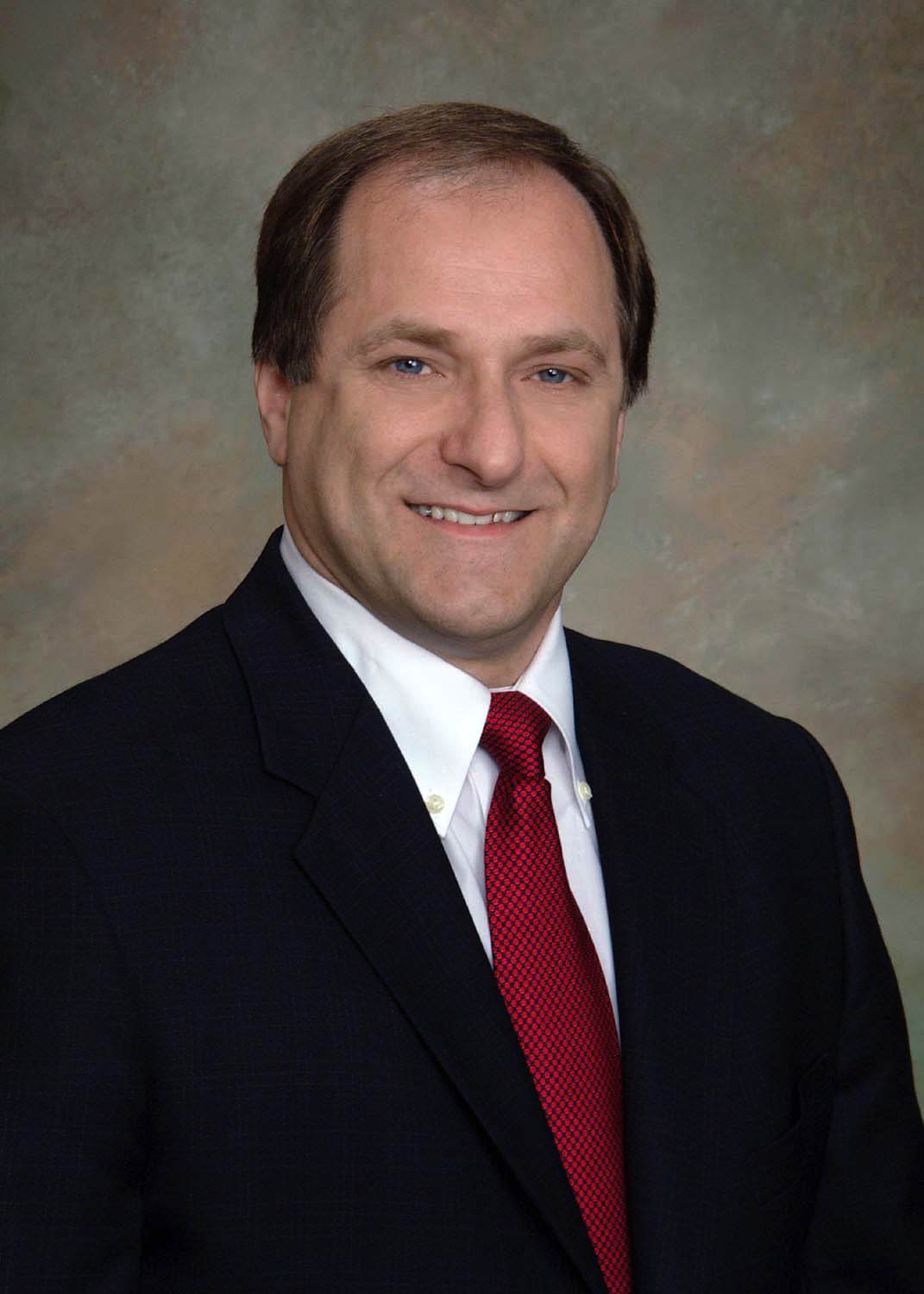
Nominee	Mike Capuano
Party	Democratic
Popular vote	165,852
Percentage	98.7%
U.S. Representative before election
Mike Capuano (inc.)
Democratic
Elected U.S. Representative
Mike Capuano
Democratic

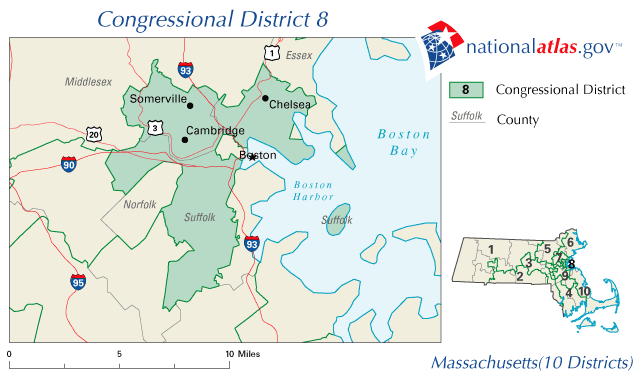

This congressional district, based in Boston and some of its southern suburbs, is the smallest district in Massachusetts and has been represented by Democratic Congressman Mike Capuano since 1999. Seeking a fourth term, Capuano faced no opposition and easily won the election.

=== Predictions ===
Source	Ranking	As of
The Cook Political Report	Safe D	October 29, 2004
Sabato's Crystal Ball	Safe D	November 1, 2004

=== Results ===
Massachusetts's 8th congressional district election, 2004
Party	Candidate	Votes	%
Democratic	Mike Capuano (inc.)	165,852	98.67
Write-ins		2,229	1.33
Total votes		168,081	100.00
Democratic hold			

== District 9 ==
2004 Massachusetts's 9th congressional district election
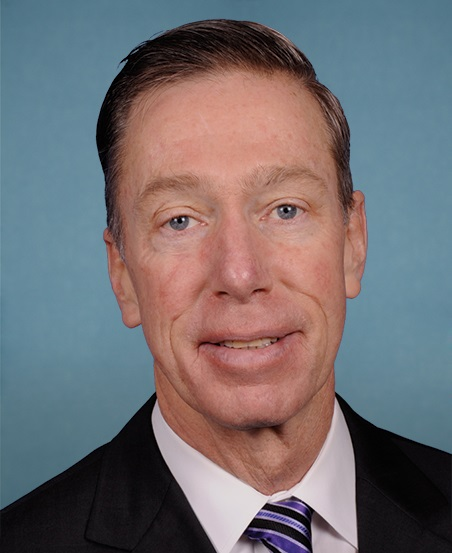
Nominee	Stephen Lynch
Party	Democratic
Popular vote	218,167
Percentage	99.0%
U.S. Representative before election
Stephen Lynch (inc.)
Democratic
Elected U.S. Representative
Stephen Lynch
Democratic

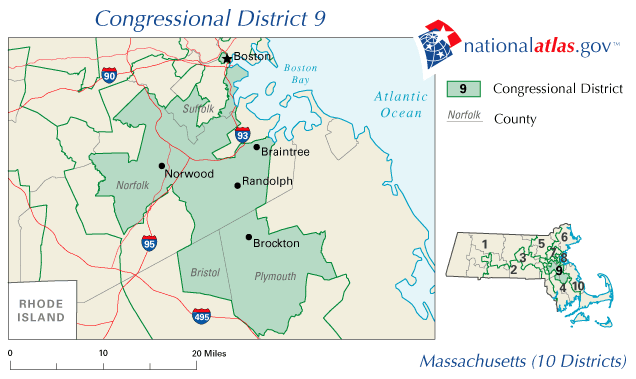

Democratic Congressman Steven Lynch, a moderate Democrat, has represented this district rooted in south Boston since he was first elected in 2001 in a special election to replace the late Congressman Joe Moakley. With a solidly liberal constituency, Congressman Lynch encountered no opposition in his bid for a third term.

=== Predictions ===
Source	Ranking	As of
The Cook Political Report	Safe D	October 29, 2004
Sabato's Crystal Ball	Safe D	November 1, 2004

=== Results ===
Massachusetts's 9th congressional district election, 2004
Party	Candidate	Votes	%
Democratic	Stephen Lynch (inc.)	218,167	99.03
Write-ins		2,145	0.97
Total votes		220,312	100.00
Democratic hold			

== District 10 ==
2004 Massachusetts's 10th congressional district election
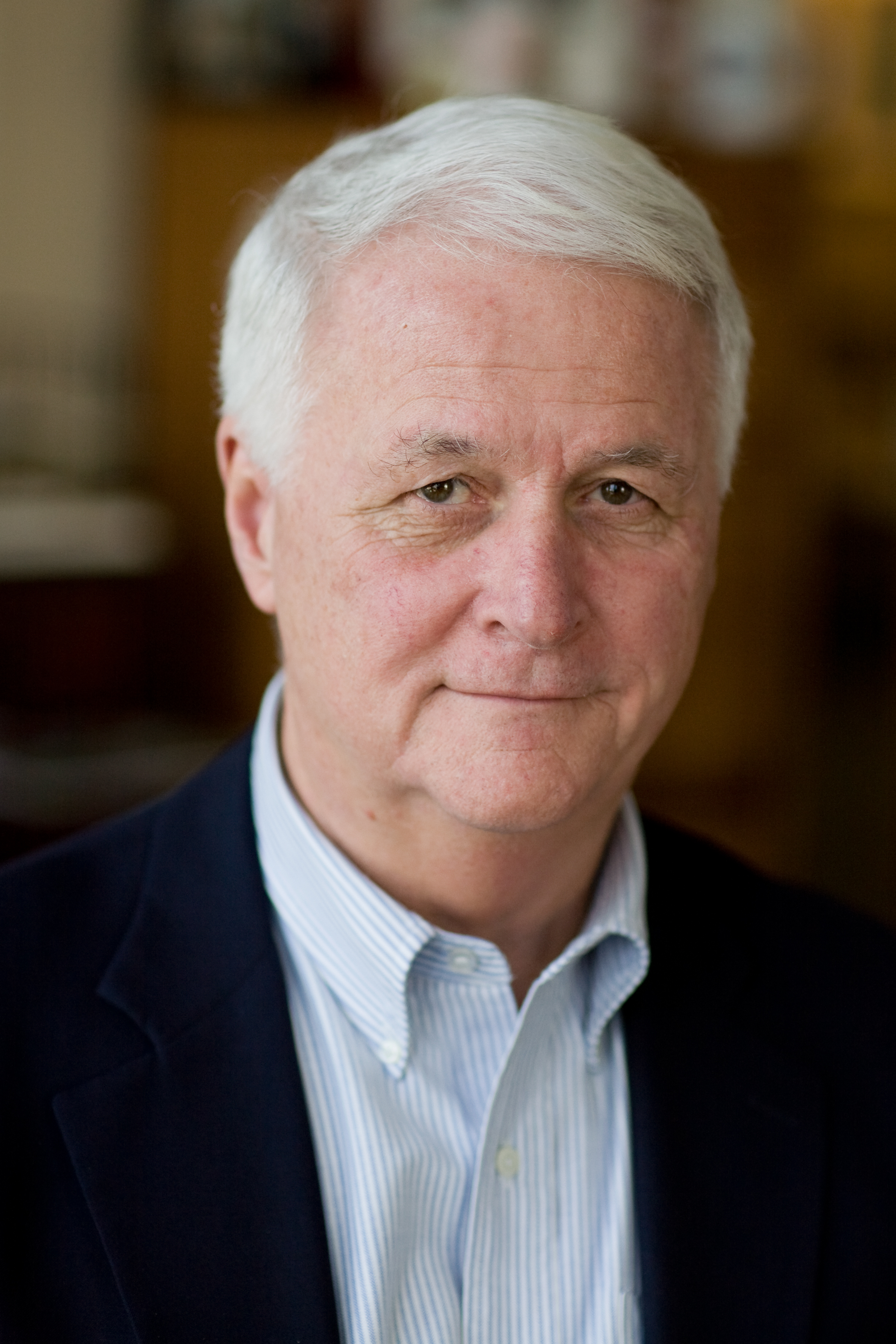

Nominee	Bill Delahunt	Michael J. Jones
Party	Democratic	Republican
Popular vote	222,013	114,879
Percentage	65.9%	34.1%
- Municipality results Delahunt: 50–60% 60–70% 70–80% 80–90% 90–100%
U.S. Representative before election
Bill Delahunt (inc.)
Democratic
Elected U.S. Representative
Bill Delahunt
Democratic

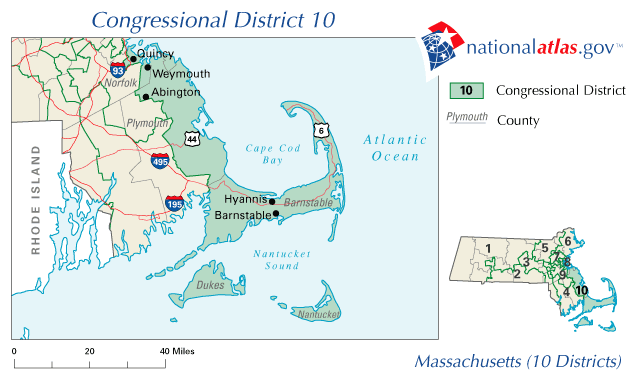

Opposed by Republican Michael Jones, incumbent Democratic Congressman Bill Delahunt sought a fifth term in this district based in the South Shore, Cape Cod and the Islands. Though more moderate than the other districts in the commonwealth, the 10th district sent Congressman Delahunt back to Washington.

=== Predictions ===
Source	Ranking	As of
The Cook Political Report	Safe D	October 29, 2004
Sabato's Crystal Ball	Safe D	November 1, 2004

=== Results ===
Massachusetts's 9th congressional district election, 2004
Party	Candidate	Votes	%
Democratic	Bill Delahunt (inc.)	222,013	65.87
Republican	Michael J. Jones	114,879	34.08
Write-ins		178	0.05
Total votes		337,070	100.00
Democratic hold			

Preceded by 2002 elections	United States House elections in Massachusetts; 2004	Succeeded by 2006 elections
