= KHDD-LP =

- Oklahoma City, Oklahoma; United States
- Broadcast area: Oklahoma City, Oklahoma
- Frequency: 99.3 MHz

Programming
- Format: Catholic Spanish

Ownership
- Owner: Oklahoma Catholic Family Conference, Inc.
- Sister stations: KRGU-LP

History
- First air date: 2017

Technical information
- Licensing authority: FCC
- Facility ID: 195711
- Class: LP1
- ERP: 45 watts
- HAAT: 44.47 meters (145.9 ft)
- Transmitter coordinates: 35°28′50″N 97°39′12″W

Links
- Public license information: LMS
- Webcast: http://s45.myradiostream.com:18212/listen.mp3
- Website: http://www.okcr.org

KHDD-LP (99.3 FM) is a low-power FM radio station licensed to Oklahoma City, Oklahoma, United States. The station is currently owned by Oklahoma Catholic Family Conference, Inc.

== History ==
The station was assigned the call sign KHDD on September 5, 2016.
