= WRIN =

- Rensselaer, Indiana; United States
- Frequency: 1560 kHz
- Branding: The Bear Country 104.5 FM & 1560 AM

Programming
- Format: Classic country
- Affiliations: Westwood One

Ownership
- Owner: Brothers Broadcasting Corporation

History
- First air date: September 14, 1963

Technical information
- Licensing authority: FCC
- Facility ID: 7308
- Class: D
- Power: 1,000 watts day; 500 watts critical hours
- Transmitter coordinates: 40°57′41.00″N 87°9′7.00″W
- Translator: 104.5 W283CO (Rensselaer)

Links
- Public license information: Public file; LMS
- Website: The Bear Country Website

WRIN (1560 AM) is a radio station in Rensselaer, Indiana. The Broadcasting Yearbook notes it was founded by five partners on September 14, 1963. Rensselaer is about 84.5 miles (136.0 km) south of Chicago in Jasper County, Indiana.

WRIN airs a classic country format using the classic country format provided via satellite from Westwood One.

According to Standard Rate and Data service, the daytime-only Class D radio station would cover Jasper, White, Newton, Benton and Pulaski counties. No other radio stations were located in any of these counties.

WRIN is important because, other than the local newspaper, The Rensselaer Republican it was the only local media for more than 10 years. Today, other local radio media exists in Earl Park, Monticello, Kentland, and Winamac, all within the original coverage of WRIN.

== History ==
FCC records show that among the investors, James Caperelli (a trucking company owner from Chicago Heights, Illinois), his wife, also James Caperelli Jr, Anthony DiCarlo Jr. (son-in-law to Caperelli), and Bob Becker, an employee of the other radio stations owned by Caperelli and DiCarlo. These people earlier started WCGO in 1959, Chicago Heights, Illinois.

Early employees of WRIN were Sports director Bob Hayes, Ted Hayes (now at WKVI, Knox, Indiana), Rev. Harry McCorkel (news director), Neal Nussbaum, Larry Nudelman (afternoon announcer), Charles "Norm" Miller (now on staff at the FCC), Weekend announcers Ron Hickman, Joe Shank, and Tom Jurek, who started as an announcer, later owner/manager.

Program schedules note that the 7:30 morning news round-up was a popular daily broadcast. Local minister and news director Harry McCorkel developed this local news program, bringing his reel to reel tape recorder to many local meetings. The program prospered with seven local annual advertisers, Earl Butz, Paul Harvey, and NBC Radio.

Many local features gave WRIN a "hometown" feel. They included local birthdays and anniversaries, pet patrol, "local names making news" also a "local talent" feature, where area people played instruments, sang, and displayed their entertainment ability, many trivia quizzes, a daily "music battle" where two pop songs faced off, and people voted by phone for their favorite, "the voice of the people" where you could express your opinion on a daily topic, and always emphasis on local happenings, including sporting events.

WRIN annually covered the Jasper, Newton, White, Pulaski and Benton county fairs, doing live remote broadcasts from each location. The station also covered local elections for those same counties.

Farm programs, including market reports, dotted the schedule, with more emphasis on farm news early morning, noontime, and when the market closed. Local farmer Wally Laird contributed to the local farm information, bringing many local guests to the airwaves. Information included "grain elevator reports", featuring corn, wheat and bean prices from ten local grain elevators.

Radio consultants told Jurek that WRIN was successful because there was sparse local competition, and the Chicago radio stations have never served Northwest Indiana very well. It was a "natural" to attract national farm advertisers like Pioneer Seed Corn and John Deere Tractors. Also, this region is quite isolated, due to "far away" geography and "low" population, as well as rural culture rather than "big city" culture from Chicago. The Gary/Hammond (North) area was an industrial and bedroom community area while the Lafayette (South) was a college and manufacturing area that was very culturally different from the five very rural counties served by WRIN.

WRIN featured "Compu Weather" reports four times every hour. Since Rensselaer is in Tornado Alley local sponsors lined up to advertise on this important feature.

The station also aired a two-hour daily talk show Sound Off that Bob Becker hosted, featuring listener phone calls, many local issues and very conservative politics. Hosting Sound Off eventually led politically conservative Bob Becker to a sponsored journey to Viet Nam.

WRIN also featured Trading Post and Harry Martin's Rural Radio Network.

Saturdays featured American Top 40 in the morning, the Texaco Metropolitan Opera radio broadcasts, Chicago Symphony Orchestra, Notre Dame football, Chicago Cubs and Bears games, Bob Gaskin's Saturday afternoon Gospel Music program, and featured middle-of-the-road music during the week.

Sundays were mostly devoted to religious programming sign-on to sign off. The exception was the late morning Chet Gulinski Polka Show. WRIN featured many local ministers and national religious programs like Words of Hope, Jimmy Swaggart, Kenneth Copeland, The PTL Club, The 700 Club, and The Lutheran Hour. Local Sunday programs included First Baptist Church with Cal Eastwood, Bethany Calls and Bethany Church service with Harry McCorkel, St. Augustine Church Catholic Mass, First Reformed Church in DeMotte, the Wheatfield Full Gospel Tabernacle, and many others.

Jurek also bought the local FM station, (WJCK), and changed the call letters to WLQI (Lucky Radio). As WJCK, the station was started by John Felthouse, a retired broadcast engineer from WBBM, Chicago. Felthouse mostly tracked beautiful music albums until he sold to Thom Brown, who had previous radio management experience with Group W Westinghouse Broadcasting. Under Brown, the WJCK format was "country music." When Jurek purchased the station and changed the call letters to WLQI, the format became "adult hits" briefly using Drake-Chenault syndication.

From 1973 to 1985 Tom Jurek hosted the WRIN Morning Wake up Show that (according to Arbitron radio ratings) had the largest share of the local listening audience. Harry McCorkel, Rick Klingaman, Doug Booth and others served as News Director. Local news was broadcast from 7:30-8:40, Noon-12:20, and following NBC radio Network News nearly every hour.

By January 1977, Becker died. Jurek bought controlling shares and, according to accounting records, the station prospered even more. FCC Records show that Jurek had a construction permit to begin an FM station in Winamac, Indiana. That frequency became a religious format station.

Later, with Annie Rose, Jurek developed a frequency for a "Merrillville, Indiana radio station, then, sold it to investors who moved it to Portage, Indiana, where the station exists today.

In 1985 Jurek sold WRIN, WLQI and the Winamac permit to John Balvich, Brothers Broadcasting, who has operated the stations since.

Logo before translator sign on
