= XHAL-FM =

Radio station in Manzanillo, Colima

- Manzanillo, Colima, Mexico; Mexico
- Broadcast area: Manzanillo, Colima
- Frequency: 97.7 FM
- Branding: Fórmula Manzanillo 97.7

Programming
- Format: News/talk
- Affiliations: Radio Fórmula

Ownership
- Owner: Silvia Evangelina Godoy Cárdenas

History
- First air date: May 10, 1957 (concession)

Technical information
- ERP: 25 kW
- Transmitter coordinates: 19°02′57″N 104°18′37″W

XHAL-FM is a radio station on 97.7 FM in Manzanillo, Colima. The station is known as Fórmula Manzanillo 97.7.

== History ==
XEAL-AM 860 got its start with a concession awarded to José Olalde Soria in 1957. It moved to FM after being authorized to do so in March 2011.
