= KHBT =

- Humboldt, Iowa; United States
- Frequency: 97.7 MHz
- Branding: 97.7 The Bolt

Programming
- Format: Classic Hits
- Affiliations: Fox News Radio, Iowa State University,

Ownership
- Owner: Open Roads Media, L.L.C.

History
- First air date: August 5, 1970
- Call sign meaning: HBT → Humboldt

Technical information
- Licensing authority: FCC
- Facility ID: 10902
- Class: A
- ERP: 5,800 watts
- HAAT: 84 m (276 ft)
- Transmitter coordinates: 42°43′57″N 94°12′23″W

Links
- Public license information: Public file; LMS
- Webcast: Listen Live
- Website: 977thebolt.com

KHBT (97.7 FM) is an American commercial radio station that serves the Humboldt, Iowa, area. The station broadcasts a classic hits format. KHBT is licensed to Open Roads Media, L.L.C., of Humboldt, Iowa.

The transmitter and broadcast tower are located in northeast Humboldt along Iowa Highway 3 near Montana Avenue. According to the Antenna Structure Registration database, the tower is 91 m (299 ft) tall with the FM broadcast antenna mounted at the 87 m (285 ft) level. The calculated Height Above Average Terrain is 84 m (276 ft).

KHBT is a FOX News affiliate and broadcasts Iowa State University sports. KHBT also broadcasts Humboldt High School Wildcat sports, (Football, Basketball, Baseball, Softball, Track, Wrestling and Volleyball) four daily newscasts Monday through Friday, Free Ride Friday, and is home to Pat Kolar and the Bolt Morning Show. In 2020, KHBT recognized 50 years of broadcasting.
