= WGLB =

- Elm Grove, Wisconsin; United States
- Broadcast area: Milwaukee metropolitan area
- Frequency: 1560 kHz

Programming
- Format: Urban contemporary gospel

Ownership
- Owner: JJK Media, LLC

History
- First air date: December 6, 1963
- Call sign meaning: "Where Gospel Lovers Belong" (originally Great Lakes Broadcasting, original owner)

Technical information
- Licensing authority: FCC
- Facility ID: 73050
- Class: B
- Power: 2,500 watts (day); 700 watts (critical hours); 250 watts (night)
- Transmitter coordinates: 43°0′32.05″N 88°2′6.32″W
- Translator: 96.1 W241CI (Milwaukee)

Links
- Public license information: Public file; LMS
- Webcast: Listen live
- Website: wglbradio.com

WGLB (1560 kHz) is a commercial AM radio station licensed to Elm Grove, Wisconsin, and serving the Milwaukee metropolitan area. It airs an urban contemporary gospel format. The license is held by JJK Media, LLC. It is co-owned by the children of former owner Joel Kinlow, making WGLB one of only a few radio stations that is owned by an African-American family. The radio studios are on West Burleigh Street in Milwaukee.

By day, WGLB is powered at 2,500 watts. To protect other stations from interference (1560 AM is a clear channel frequency reserved for Class A station WFME in New York City), WGLB reduces power at night to 250 watts. It uses a directional antenna with a four-tower array. During critical hours, the power is 700 watts. The transmitter is on South 98th Street near Interstate 41 in West Allis, Wisconsin. Programming is also heard on 99-watt FM translator W241CI at 96.1 MHz in Milwaukee.

== History ==
WGLB signed on the air on December 6, 1953. Its original city of license was Port Washington, Wisconsin. It broadcast with 250 watts, as a daytime only station.

In 1969, a sister station, WGLB-FM, was launched on 100.1 MHz (now WSJP-FM). At first, they mostly simulcast their programming. In 1995, WGLB was purchased by Joel Kinlow, a Milwaukee area minister, out of bankruptcy for $311,900. Kinlow split the simulcast in 1996, replacing their soft adult contemporary and jazz programming with black gospel on AM 1560 and 1970s oldies on WGLB-FM. In 2003, the FM station was sold to Starboard Broadcasting, which flipped it to Catholic religious programming. Kinlow also once owned television station WJJA (channel 49) in Racine, which aired programming from the Home Shopping Network (HSN).

In August 2001, WGLB's city of license was changed to the Milwaukee suburb of Elm Grove, and the current transmitter site went into operation. The station also obtained authorization to begin nighttime broadcasting.

Former logo

On April 20, 2015, WGLB was granted a Federal Communications Commission construction permit to increase day power to 2,500 watts and add critical hours service with 700 watts.

Kinlow died on June 7, 2016; however, his children continue to own and operate WGLB.

== Translator ==
Call sign	Frequency	City of license	FID	ERP (W)	Class	Transmitter coordinates	FCC info
W241CI	96.1 FM	Milwaukee, Wisconsin	144520	250	D	43°2′21.1″N 87°55′9.3″W	LMS
