= KRGU-LP =

- Midwest City, Oklahoma; United States
- Broadcast area: Oklahoma City, Oklahoma
- Frequency: 97.7 MHz

Programming
- Format: Catholic Religious Spanish

Ownership
- Owner: Midwest City Knights Of Columbus Building Corporation
- Sister stations: KHDD-LP

History
- First air date: 2017

Technical information
- Licensing authority: FCC
- Facility ID: 195675
- Class: LP1
- ERP: 73 watts
- HAAT: 35 meters (115 ft)
- Transmitter coordinates: 35°25′36″N 97°26′31″W

Links
- Public license information: LMS
- Webcast: http://s45.myradiostream.com:18212/listen.mp3
- Website: http://www.okcr.org

KRGU-LP (97.7 FM) is a low-power FM radio station licensed to Midwest City, Oklahoma, United States. The station is currently owned by Midwest City Knights of Columbus Building Corporation

== History ==
The station call sign KRGU-LP on April 27, 2016.
