= WTGO-LP =

Coordinates: 40°23′26″N 86°51′52″W

Lafayette, Indiana; United States
- Frequency: 97.7 MHz

Programming
- Format: Christian rock

Ownership
- Owner: Harvest Chapel, Inc.

History
- First air date: 2003
- Call sign meaning: Where Truth Goes On

Technical information
- Licensing authority: FCC
- Facility ID: 124424
- Class: L1
- ERP: 100 watts
- HAAT: 27.6 meters (91 ft)

Links
- Public license information: LMS

WTGO-LP (97.7 FM) is a low-powered, non-commercial radio station licensed to Lafayette, Indiana. WTGO-LP broadcasts at an effective radiated power of 100 watts. The station's studio and offices are located at 724 Wabash Avenue in Lafayette, with a tower facility located on South 30th Street in Lafayette.

== History ==
WTGO-LP was founded by Harvest Chapel Pastor Tom Camp, the father of Christian contemporary musician Jeremy Camp. It began broadcasting in late 2003, taking a Christian rock format in 2005. It was also the first low power FM station to be licensed to the Greater Lafayette area.

== Programming ==
WTGO-LP was originally engineered and managed by Andrew Longman who left in August 2004. In 2005 Matt Whatley was brought on board as both an audio engineer and WTGO-LP's Station Manager. In March 2005, Robert Schueler was brought on initially to help with the technicals of building an off-site studio and later becoming the PM and then AM and PM host of the "Bob-Squad" show, which lasted from May 2005 to April 2007. Whatley left the station in May 2006 and Schueler took over as Station Manager and DJ. Schueler left WTGO-LP in April 2007. With the addition of Brett Estes as Program Director in August 2007, the program format was revamped to more of a rock/metal sound. Estes also hosted "The Rock" Morning Show. Estes left WTGO in May 2010.

Truth Talk with Tom was a show that aired live at 11:30 AM on Tuesday and Thursday. It was also re-aired the same day at 6PM. The hour long talk show was produced live in the studio. The show thrived off of questions from listeners who call or email questions and comments about life, the Bible, Christianity, God, etc. The show featured Tom Camp, the pastor of Harvest Chapel (owners of WTGO-LP), and Brett Estes the stations morning show host and program director. Other guest who have made appearances on the show are Trent O'Brien, the afternoon DJ, Ryan Harrison (the church's youth pastor), Eric Hollingsworth, and Jeremy Camp (Tom's son.) The show was canceled in April 2010.

Christian Hardcore and Christian Heavy Metal was aired on Friday and Saturday nights from 10-midnight (hosted by Spike Chiquet as well) including the syndicated The Full Armor of God Broadcast but the shows were canceled due to a change of the station's music format and the final episodes aired January 23, 2010.

WTGO-LP's Sunday programming format is lighter musically and includes more worship songs. The station expects an exemplary and verifiably Christian lifestyle of its staff. In terms of its music, WTGO thoroughly reviews each song's lyrical content and overall message before adding it to the rotation and attempts to ensure that both the songs of bands that perform and their personal lifestyles are exemplify the values held by the station. On May 8, 2009, WTGO-LP began broadcasting online. Shortly after that they developed an iPhone app which is a free download and allows the user to stream the station, and make request through a phone call, text message, or email.
