= WHZK-LP =

- Greenwood, South Carolina; United States
- Frequency: 97.7 MHz

Ownership
- Owner: South Carolina Mass Choir, Inc.

Technical information
- Licensing authority: FCC
- Facility ID: 131832
- Class: L1
- ERP: 36 watts
- HAAT: 49.0 meters (160.8 ft)
- Transmitter coordinates: 34°11′8″N 82°8′49″W

Links
- Public license information: LMS

WHZK-LP (97.7 FM) is a radio station licensed to Greenwood, South Carolina, United States. The station is currently owned by South Carolina Mass Choir, Inc.
