= CFXX-FM =

Radio station in Siksika, Alberta, Canada

- Siksika, Alberta; Canada
- Frequency: 97.7 MHz
- Branding: The Nation's Station

Programming
- Format: First Nations community radio

Ownership
- Owner: Siksika Communications

History
- First air date: 2001
- Former call signs: CHDH-FM (2001–2012)
- Former frequencies: 103.1 MHz (2001–2007); 97.7 MHz (2007–2014)

Technical information
- Licensing authority: CRTC
- ERP: 25 watts (average); 50 watts (peak)
- HAAT: 24.3 metres (80 ft)
- Transmitter coordinates: 50°50′53.16″N 113°3′36″W

Links
- Webcast: Listen live

CFXX-FM is a First Nations community radio station which operates at 104.7 MHz (FM) in Siksika, Alberta, Canada.

== History ==
In the summer 1989, Wade Healy returned to Siksika from apprenticing at 89.9 CFWE-FM (Lac La Biche Alberta) to begin broadcasting on behalf of a society to be incorporated received approval from the Canadian Radio-television and Telecommunications Commission (CRTC) to operate a new Type B English and native-language FM radio station at Siksika. The station, which took the call sign CHDH-FM, would operate at 103.1 MHz. The initial transmitter operated in mono, at 50 watts. Throughout the years the station improved equipment and eventually went stereo and launched its internet version. On the licence renewal in 2007, CHDH-FM's frequency was listed as 97.7 MHz.

In 2012, the station became CFXX-FM at 104.7 MHz.

The station is currently owned by Siksika Nation Tribal Administration.
