= WJEV-LP =

- Dale City, Virginia; United States
- Frequency: 97.7 MHz
- Branding: Radio Vida

Programming
- Format: Spanish Religious

Ownership
- Owner: Ministerio de Vida

History
- First air date: December 1, 2014

Technical information
- Licensing authority: FCC
- Facility ID: 193904
- Class: L1
- ERP: 60 watts
- HAAT: 39.2 meters (129 ft)
- Transmitter coordinates: 38°38′53.98″N 77°21′37.06″W

Links
- Public license information: LMS
- Webcast: Listen live
- Website: www.radiovidava.com

WJEV-LP is a Spanish Religious formatted broadcast radio station licensed to Dale City, Virginia and serving Dale City and Montclair in Virginia. WJEV-LP is owned and operated by Ministerio de Vida.
