= KZBG =

- Lapwai, Idaho; United States
- Broadcast area: Lewiston area
- Frequency: 97.7 MHz (HD Radio)
- Branding: Big Country 97.7

Programming
- Format: Country
- Subchannels: HD2: B97.3 (Top 40/CHR); HD3: 92.1 Hank FM (Classic country); HD4: Big Rock 99.1 (Classic rock)

Ownership
- Owner: James and Darcy Nelly; (Nelly Broadcasting, LLC)

History
- First air date: 2005 (as KFFR)
- Former call signs: KFFR (1996–2007)

Technical information
- Licensing authority: FCC
- Facility ID: 83397
- Class: A
- ERP: 570 watts
- HAAT: 323 meters (1,060 ft)
- Transmitter coordinates: 46°27′22″N 117°2′56″W
- Translators: HD2: 97.3 K247AW (Lewiston); HD3: 92.1 K221FW (Lewiston); HD4: 99.1 K256BY (Lewiston)

Links
- Public license information: Public file; LMS
- Webcast: Listen Live; Listen Live (HD2); Listen Live (HD3); Listen Live (HD4)
- Website: Big Country 97.7; B97.3 (HD2); 92.1 Hank FM (HD3); Big Rock 99.1 (HD4)

KZBG (97.7 FM) is a radio station broadcasting a country music format. Licensed to Lapwai, Idaho, United States, the station serves the Lewiston area. The station is currently owned by James and Darcy Nelly, through licensee Nelly Broadcasting, LLC.

== History ==
The station was assigned the calls KFFR on 1996-09-12. On 2007-08-06, the station changed to the current KZBG.

== HD Radio ==
KZBG broadcasts on three additional subchannels:

- On HD2, it broadcasts a top 40 format, branded as "B97.3".
- On HD3, it broadcasts a classic country format. In January 2018, it rebranded from "Big Country Classics" to "92.1 Hank FM".
- On HD4, it broadcasts a classic rock format, branded as "Big Rock 99.1". On October 21, 2019, it changed their format from sports to classic rock, branded as "Big Rock 99.1".
