= WUME-FM =

- Paoli, Indiana; United States
- Frequency: 95.3 MHz
- Branding: Mix 95.3

Programming
- Format: Hot adult contemporary

Ownership
- Owner: Diamond Shores Broadcasting, LLC
- Sister stations: WSEZ

History
- First air date: September 1972

Technical information
- Licensing authority: FCC
- Facility ID: 28600
- Class: A
- ERP: 3,000 watts
- HAAT: 91 meters (299 ft)
- Transmitter coordinates: 38°32′25″N 86°28′42″W

Links
- Public license information: Public file; LMS
- Webcast: Listen Live
- Website: wume953.com

WUME 95.3 FM is a radio station broadcasting a hot adult contemporary format. Licensed to Paoli, Indiana, the station is owned by Diamond Shores Broadcasting, LLC.
