= KICM =

- Healdton, Oklahoma; United States
- Broadcast area: Ardmore, Oklahoma; Duncan, Oklahoma; Pauls Valley, Oklahoma
- Frequency: 97.7 MHz
- Branding: The Big Station

Programming
- Format: Country music Contemporary Hit Radio

Ownership
- Owner: Keystone Broadcasting Corporation

Technical information
- Licensing authority: FCC
- Facility ID: 71054
- Class: C2
- ERP: 50,000 watts
- HAAT: 150 meters (490 ft)
- Transmitter coordinates: 34.34917°N 97.45667°W

Links
- Public license information: Public file; LMS
- Webcast: Listen live
- Website: kicm.com

KICM (97.7 FM) is a radio station licensed to Healdton, Oklahoma. The station broadcasts a country music and contemporary hit radio format and is owned by Keystone Broadcasting Corporation.

KICM 97.7FM was purchased by Keystone Broadcasting in 2005. Keystone Broadcasting is locally owned by Bill Countryman, Bob Sullins, and Jack Haigh. KICM was a Class A radio station prior to 2007. KICM 97.7 FM was upgraded to a Class C2 in 2007. KICM 97.7 FM is home to all of Ardmore High School sports, Lone Grove High School sports and Sulphur High School sports and covers Area games of the week.

KICM 97.7 FM won the 2021 Oklahoma Association of Broadcasters Small Market Radio award, "Best of Show" formerly "Station of the Year.”
