= WCLS =

Coordinates: 39°13′22.00″N 86°38′40.00″W

- Spencer, Indiana; United States
- Broadcast area: Bloomington, Indiana
- Frequency: 97.7 MHz
- Branding: Classic Hits 97.7

Programming
- Format: Classic hits
- Affiliations: ABC News Radio

Ownership
- Owner: Mid-America Radio of Indiana

History
- First air date: March 14, 1983 (as WLSO)
- Former call signs: WLSO (1983–1988); WSKT (1988–2005)
- Call sign meaning: "Classic Hits"

Technical information
- Licensing authority: FCC
- Facility ID: 61922
- Class: A
- ERP: 6,000 watts
- HAAT: 100 meters (330 ft)

Links
- Public license information: Public file; LMS
- Webcast: Listen live
- Website: wcls977fm.com

WCLS (97.7 FM) is a radio station licensed to Spencer, Indiana, United States, the station serves the Bloomington area with a classic hits format. The station is owned by Mid-America Radio of Indiana.

The station is an affiliate of the IndyCar Radio Network, and carries the only live and legal broadcast of the Indianapolis 500.

== History ==
The station went on the air as WLSO on March 14, 1983. On August 18, 1988, the station changed its call sign to WSKT. It again changed its call sign on October 23, 2005, to its present name of WCLS.

The call letters were previously assigned to a station in Columbus, Georgia (now WIOL), to a station in Detroit, Michigan (now WYCD), and to a station in Oscoda, Michigan (now WWTH).
