= WSBV =

Radio station in South Boston, Virginia

- South Boston, Virginia; United States
- Broadcast area: South Boston, Virginia; Halifax County, Virginia
- Frequency: 1560 kHz
- Branding: 1560AM WSBV

Programming
- Format: Black Gospel

Ownership
- Owner: Lamont Logan; (Logan Broadcasting, Inc.)

History
- First air date: 1989
- Call sign meaning: W South Boston Virginia

Technical information
- Licensing authority: FCC
- Facility ID: 64646
- Class: D
- Power: 2,500 Watts daytime 250 Watts critical hours
- Transmitter coordinates: 36°42′35.0″N 78°52′28.0″W

Links
- Public license information: Public file; LMS

WSBV is a Black Gospel formatted broadcast radio station licensed to South Boston, Virginia, serving South Boston and Halifax County, Virginia. WSBV is owned by Lamont Logan, through licensee Logan Broadcasting, Inc.
