= Antena 1 Fortaleza =

Antena 1 Fortaleza (ZYS 804)
- Fortaleza, Ceará; Brazil
- Frequency: 97.7 MHz

Programming
- Language: Portuguese
- Format: Music; adult contemporary; pop

Ownership
- Owner: Rádio Costa do Sol Ltda.

History
- First air date: January 1, 2005
- Former names: Nossa Rádio Ceará

Technical information
- Licensing authority: ANATEL
- Class: A1
- ERP: 131.5 kW

Links
- Public license information: Profile

Antena 1 Fortaleza (ZYS 804) is a radio station licensed to Fortaleza, Ceará, serving the respective metropolitan area. Founded in 2005 by businessmen Gaudêncio Lucena and Carlos Gualter, the station became known for its trajectory as a popular music radio station. For 15 years, it broadcast the evangelical radio network Nossa Rádio.

== History ==
The broadcaster's concession was obtained in 2002 by businessman Gaudêncio Lucena and initially had a partnership with politician Eunício Oliveira, with the launch scheduled for 2004. Costa do Sol FM was created in Fortaleza on May 1, 2005 by businessman and politician Gaudêncio Lucena. It was launched with great enthusiasm on the part of its owner, announced as the "first 100% digital radio station in Ceará", and was notable for operating with 50 kW of power, which covered the metropolitan region of Fortaleza, the interior of the state and part of Rio Grande do Norte. In addition to the investments in technology, the station made major hires.

The official launch of Costa do Sol FM took place on July 17, 2005. Its slogan was “Quem sintoniza, fica!” and its programming was popular, focused on the BCD classes, in the 15-40 age group, with a predominantly female audience. Costa do Sol FM's goal was to form a network of radio stations. In its last year on air, it only had music programming.

On March 1, 2010, Costa do Sol FM was leased to the International Church of the Grace of God, which aired the programming of the evangelical radio network Nossa Rádio, renaming it Nossa Rádio Ceará. The lease lasts for 15 years, ending on March 6, 2025. From that date, the station will broadcast a varied selection of music, including adult contemporary, pop and MPB songs.

== Bibliography ==
- Canalito, Jorge; Leme, Paulinho (2007). "FM Costa do Sol 97,7 MHz". Rádio FM: Em Fortaleza é outra história. Fortaleza, Ceará: Premius Editora. p. 145. ISBN 9788590732907.
