= WVCU-LP =

- Athens, West Virginia; United States
- Broadcast area: Athens, West Virginia; Princeton, West Virginia
- Frequency: 97.7 MHz
- Branding: Mountain Lion Radio

Programming
- Format: Variety

Ownership
- Owner: Concord University

History
- First air date: May 1, 2015
- Call sign meaning: West Virginia Concord University

Technical information
- Licensing authority: FCC
- Facility ID: 194515
- Class: L1
- ERP: 11 watts
- HAAT: 88 meters (289 ft)
- Transmitter coordinates: 37°25′26.40″N 81°0′21.90″W

Links
- Public license information: LMS
- Webcast: WVCU-LP Webstream
- Website: WVCU-LP Online

WVCU-LP is a Variety formatted low-power broadcast radio station licensed to Athens, West Virginia, serving Athens and Princeton in West Virginia. WVCU-LP is owned and operated by Concord University.
