= WMGZ =

- Eatonton, Georgia; United States
- Broadcast area: Lake Oconee/Lake Sinclair
- Frequency: 97.7 MHz
- Branding: 97 Big FM

Programming
- Format: Classic hits

Ownership
- Owner: Southern Stone Broadcasting, Inc.
- Sister stations: WDDK

History
- First air date: 1987 (as WDJJ)
- Former call signs: WDJJ (1987); WSKS (1987–1993)

Technical information
- Licensing authority: FCC
- Facility ID: 41993
- Class: C1
- ERP: 100,000 watts
- HAAT: 207 meters
- Transmitter coordinates: 33°50′56.50″N 82°46′28.53″W

Links
- Public license information: Public file; LMS
- Website: 97bigfm.com

WMGZ (97.7 FM) is a radio station broadcasting a classic hits format. Licensed to Eatonton, Georgia, United States. The station is currently owned by Southern Stone Broadcasting, Inc.

In March 2010, Z97 abandoned the ABC Radio format in order to provide a local radio format. Z97 featured local DJs on the air weekdays, 6am until 10pm.

== History ==
previous logo

The station was assigned the call letters WDJJ on 1987-04-14. On 1987-12-17, the station changed its call sign to WSKS then on 1993-07-22 to the current WMGZ.

On July 5, 2016, WMGZ changed their format from hot adult contemporary to classic hits, branded as "97 Big FM".

On February 23, 2017, WMGZ began transmitting from their upgraded facilities in Lexington, Georgia.

== Previous logo ==
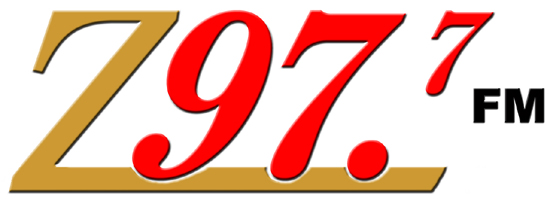
