= KCYP-LP =

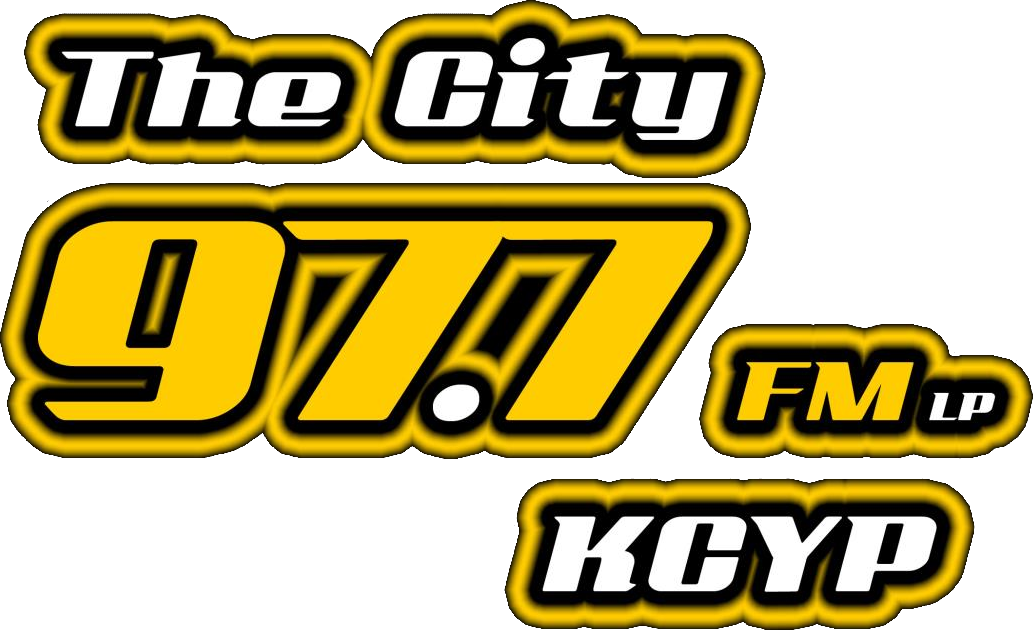
- Mission, Texas; United States
- Frequency: 97.7 MHz

Programming
- Format: Alternative rock

Ownership
- Owner: Intercity Christian Youth Program

History
- First air date: 2008
- Call sign meaning: "Christian Youth Program"

Technical information
- Licensing authority: FCC
- Facility ID: 135621
- Class: L1
- ERP: 35 watts
- HAAT: 20.5 meters (67 ft)
- Transmitter coordinates: 26°21′49″N 98°16′59″W

Links
- Public license information: LMS

KCYP-LP (97.7 FM) is a radio station licensed to Mission, Texas, United States. The station is owned by Intercity Christian Youth Program.
