= DZLT-FM =

Radio station in Tarlac, Philippines

Love Radio Tarlac (DZLT)
- Tarlac City; Philippines
- Broadcast area: Tarlac and surrounding areas
- Frequency: 97.7 MHz
- Branding: 97.7 Love Radio

Programming
- Languages: Kapampangan, Filipino
- Format: Contemporary MOR, OPM
- Network: Love Radio

Ownership
- Owner: MBC Media Group
- Operator: Star East Production & Marketing Services

History
- First air date: June 2, 2014
- Call sign meaning: Love Radio Tarlac

Technical information
- Licensing authority: NTC
- Class: C, D, E
- Power: 3 kW

Links
- Webcast: Listen Live
- Website: Love Radio Tarlac

97.7 Love Radio (DZLT 97.7 MHz) is an FM station owned by MBC Media Group and operated by Star East Production & Marketing Services. Its studios and transmitter are located at the 3rd floor, Intellect Bldg., Perez Ave., Brgy. San Sebastian, Tarlac City.
