= WSJP (AM) =

- Sussex, Wisconsin; United States
- Broadcast area: Milwaukee metropolitan area
- Frequency: 1640 kHz (HD Radio)
- Branding: Relevant Radio

Programming
- Language: English
- Format: Catholic radio
- Network: Relevant Radio

Ownership
- Owner: Relevant Radio; (Relevant Radio, Inc.)
- Sister stations: WSJP-FM

History
- First air date: October 1979
- Former call signs: WAZI (1998); WKSH (1998–2014)
- Former frequencies: 1370 kHz (1979–1998)
- Call sign meaning: Named in honor of Saint John Paul II

Technical information
- Licensing authority: FCC
- Facility ID: 87121
- Class: B
- Power: 10,000 watts (day); 1,000 watts (night)
- Transmitter coordinates: 43°4′38.04″N 88°11′32.33″W
- Translator: 99.9 W260DP (Pewaukee)

Links
- Public license information: Public file; LMS
- Website: www.relevantradio.com

WSJP (1640 kHz) is an American AM radio station licensed to Sussex, Wisconsin, and owned by Relevant Radio. It broadcasts Catholic-based religious programming; along with WSJP-FM 100.1, it is one of two Relevant Radio stations in the Milwaukee metropolitan area.

== History ==
WSJP began as the "expanded band" twin to a station broadcasting on the standard AM band, which originally signed on in 1979, as WCQL (Waukesha County's Quality Listening), a highly directional daytime-only station licensed to Pewaukee on 1370 kHz. After a failure to generate adequate ratings or revenue with an adult standards format, that station's owners, George and Mary Scoufis (SKR Incorporated), experimented with contemporary Christian music until 1983, when it was sold to a group called Dri-Four Incorporated (which later became L & L Pewaukee Ventures). Those investors expanded the operation into a 24-hour station (requiring the change in community of license to Sussex), changed the call sign to WGNW and launched a news/talk format. However the low-power directional signal prevented the station from ever seriously competing against powerhouses like WTMJ and WISN.

In 1985, the owners ended the news-talk format, and entered into a local marketing agreement (LMA) with Wisconsin Petra Productions, which changed the callsign to WKSH, re-branded the station as KS-14 and programmed a Christian rock music format. Later, a group called Heir Force Ministries operated the station for a number of years. In the 1990s, the station's programming was taken over by Life Message, who changed the format to an even more conservative mix of teaching and inspirational music, which continued until L & L sold the station to The Walt Disney Company in 2002, for $2.6 million.

=== Expanded Band assignment ===
On March 17, 1997, the Federal Communications Commission (FCC) announced that 88 stations had been given permission to move to newly available "Expanded Band" transmitting frequencies, ranging from 1610 to 1700 kHz, with WKSH authorized to move from 1370 kHz to 1640 kHz. The FCC's initial policy was that both the original station and its expanded band counterpart could operate simultaneously for up to five years, after which owners would have to turn in one of the two licenses, depending on whether they preferred the new assignment or elected to remain on the original frequency. The new station on 1640 AM was originally assigned the call sign WAZI. On August 10, 1998, the two stations swapped call signs, with WKSH going to 1640 AM, and WAZI transferred to 1370 AM. On December 15, 1999, the license for 1370 AM was cancelled, as station programming moved to 1640 kHz.

=== Later history ===
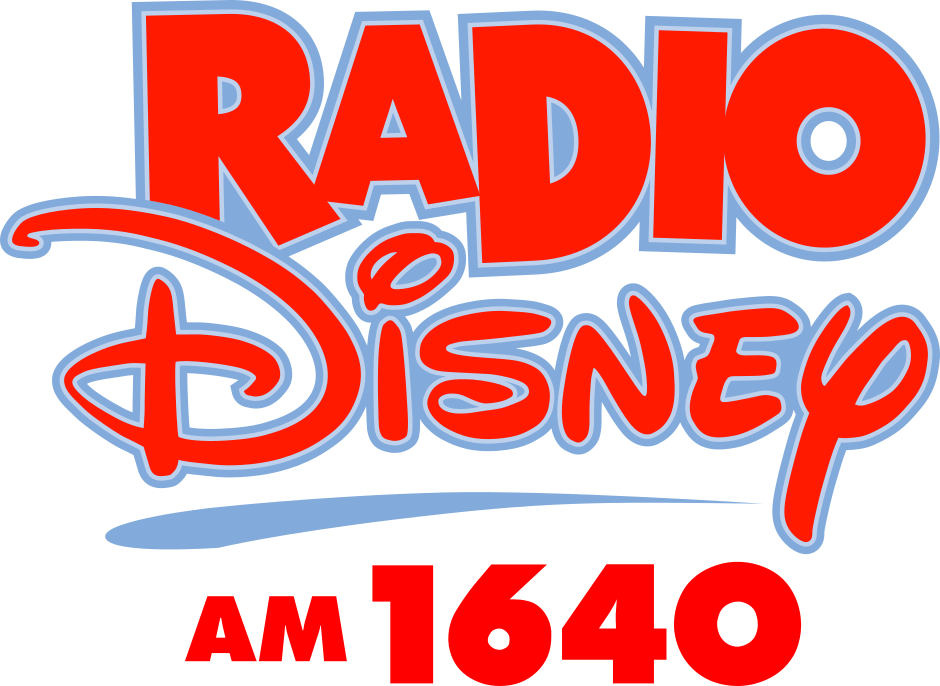
WKSH logo used from 2002 until 2007.

In December 2002, WKSH's owner shut down their business, and Disney's ABC Radio Networks division bought the station in order to convert the station to Radio Disney, with a children's/contemporary hit radio format, and the station began broadcasting in C-QUAM AM stereo. WKSH carried the network's entire schedule except for some local-specific public affairs programming on Sunday mornings, and automated station identifications, although the station maintained a local staff which promoted the station through public events, live remotes and contests and did so on air from time-to-time. In 2005, WKSH discontinued broadcasting in AM stereo.

In June 2013, Disney put WKSH and six other Radio Disney stations in medium markets up for sale, to refocus the network's broadcast distribution on top-25 markets. Disney did not own the studio building or the transmitter site — a lease remained in effect for several years — which complicated the sale. After Radio Disney's removal, the station, which had also transmitted in HD Radio, began to transmit in analog-only permanently. (Radio Disney eventually returned to the market through Entercom's WMYX-FM HD2 (99.1-2) in 2017, until the fall of 2018, under the network's new HD Radio leased access model).

On September 29, 2013, WKSH was taken off-the-air. Until it was sold, it continued to come back on the air occasionally at the end of each month with a continuous loop of Broadway tunes and easy listening music between station identifications, due to its special temporary authority to remain silent having not had action taken upon it by the FCC. This allowed the station to maintain its license by having some content air in each thirty-day period.

In November 2013, when Disney filed to sell its station in Richmond, Virginia, WDZY, to a subsidiary of Wilkins Parent Corporation, it stated that WKSH would also be acquired by Wilkins. That deal never appeared in the FCC database; in March 2014, Disney instead filed to sell the station for $725,000 to Starboard Media Foundation, which broadcasts Catholic programming on its stations through the Relevant Radio network. WKSH was the network's second station in the market, as Relevant Radio already served Milwaukee's northern suburbs via Port Washington's WSJP-FM (100.1).

The sale was "consummated" on May 30, 2014; that same day the call letters were changed to WSJP. On June 3, the station returned to the air broadcasting Relevant Radio's schedule.

== Translator ==
Call sign	Frequency	City of license	FID	ERP (W)	Class	Transmitter coordinates	FCC info
W260DP	99.9 FM	Pewaukee, Wisconsin	202827	250	D	43°4′38″N 88°11′32″W	LMS
