= WLQI =

Coordinates: 40°58′14″N 87°09′10″W

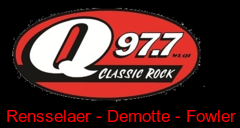
- Rensselaer, Indiana; United States
- Broadcast area: Rensselaer, Indiana; Roselawn, Indiana; Fair Oaks, Indiana
- Frequency: 97.7 MHz
- Branding: The Q 97.7

Programming
- Format: Classic rock

Ownership
- Owner: Brothers Broadcasting Corporation

History
- First air date: 1973

Technical information
- Licensing authority: FCC
- Facility ID: 7309
- Class: A
- ERP: 3,300 watts
- HAAT: 91 meters (299 ft)

Links
- Public license information: Public file; LMS
- Webcast: Listen live
- Website: wlqi977.com

WLQI (97.7 FM, "The Q") is a radio station broadcasting a classic rock format. Licensed to Rensselaer, Indiana, the station serves the areas of Rensselaer, Indiana and Roselawn, Indiana, and is owned by Brothers Broadcasting Corporation. WLQI is licensed to broadcast with an effective radiated power up to 6,000 watts using an antenna height of 91 meters.
