= WSJP-FM =

Coordinates: 43.421°N 87.995°W

- Port Washington, Wisconsin; United States
- Broadcast area: Greater Milwaukee
- Frequency: 100.1 MHz
- Branding: Relevant Radio

Programming
- Format: Catholic talk and teaching
- Network: Relevant Radio

Ownership
- Owner: Relevant Radio; (Relevant Radio, Inc.)
- Sister stations: WSJP (AM)

History
- First air date: October 1969
- Former call signs: WGLB-FM (1969–2003); WPJP (2003–2014)
- Call sign meaning: Station is named in honor of Pope Saint John Paul II

Technical information
- Licensing authority: FCC
- Facility ID: 73051
- Class: A
- ERP: 6,000 watts
- HAAT: 97 meters (318 ft)

Links
- Public license information: Public file; LMS
- Webcast: Listen live
- Website: www.relevantradio.com

WSJP-FM (100.1 MHz) is a listener-supported radio station licensed to Port Washington, Wisconsin, and serving Greater Milwaukee. It is simulcast with sister station WSJP (1640 AM). They air Catholic-based talk and teaching shows and are owned by Relevant Radio, Inc. WSJP-AM-FM carry most of the national Relevant Radio network schedule, but also air some local programming, including Milwaukee Archbishop Jerome Listecki's Sunday Mass, and Marquette Golden Eagles men's basketball.

WSJP-FM is a Class A FM station, with an effective radiated power (ERP) of 6,000 watts. The transmitter is on Lakeland Road in Saukville. WSJP-FM is the only full-power radio station licensed to a community in Ozaukee County.

== History ==
=== WGLB-FM ===
The station signed on the air in October 1969 as WGLB-FM. It aired a variety of programming over its first 34 years, including country music, Top 40 and Classic hits. Most of these formats were also simulcast on its former AM sister station, WGLB (1560 AM).

For a time, WGLB-AM-FM carried various satellite-delivered syndicated formats, and in later years, they were mostly live and local. The classic hits-era slogan was "Retro Radio". WGLB-AM-FM briefly carried Don Imus's syndicated morning talk radio show from New York City in the late 1990s. The stations languished at the bottom of the Milwaukee area ratings due to its location and limited signal, which did not penetrate the southern half of Milwaukee County.

=== Catholic programming ===
Former logo

WGLB-FM was owned by Joel Kinlow until 2003, when he sold the station to Catholic broadcaster Starboard Radio, the forerunner to Relevant Radio. WGLB-FM signed off the air on May 21, 2003. Following a facilities upgrade, WPJP (for the initials of Pope John Paul II) officially debuted on August 22, 2003. Kinlow continued to own 1560 AM, which retains the WGLB call sign and airs an urban gospel format.

WPJP's call letters were changed to WSJP-FM on March 17, 2014, just over a month before John Paul was canonized (declared a saint) on April 27.
