= KQMO =

- Shell Knob, Missouri; United States
- Broadcast area: Branson, Missouri; Aurora, Missouri; Monett, Missouri
- Frequency: 97.7 MHz
- Branding: La Mas Grande

Programming
- Format: Regional Mexican

Ownership
- Owner: Falcon Broadcasting, Inc.

History
- First air date: 1999

Technical information
- Licensing authority: FCC
- Facility ID: 84490
- Class: A
- ERP: 2,100 watts
- HAAT: 170 meters (560 ft)
- Transmitter coordinates: 36°44′54″N 93°39′30″W

Links
- Public license information: Public file; LMS
- Website: kqmo977.com

KQMO is a radio station airing a Regional Mexican format licensed to Shell Knob, Missouri, broadcasting on 97.7 FM. The station is owned by Falcon Broadcasting, Inc.
