= KJSM-FM =

- Augusta, Arkansas; United States
- Broadcast area: Searcy, Arkansas; Northeastern Suburbs of the Little Rock Metropolitan Area
- Frequency: 97.7 MHz

Ownership
- Owner: Family Worship Center Church

History
- Former call signs: KABK-FM (1979–2003)
- Call sign meaning: K Jimmy Swaggart Ministries (owners of SonLife Broadcasting Network)

Technical information
- Licensing authority: FCC
- Facility ID: 26390
- Class: C1
- ERP: 100,000 watts
- HAAT: 189.0 meters
- Transmitter coordinates: 35°10′36″N 91°23′49″W

Links
- Public license information: Public file; LMS
- Website: http://sonlifetv.com

KJSM-FM (97.7 FM) is a radio station licensed to Augusta, Arkansas, United States. The station is currently owned by Family Worship Center Church.

== History ==
The station went on the air as KABK-FM on 1979-11-19. On 2003-03-04, the station changed its call sign to the current KJSM.
