= KWNK-LP =

Low-power FM radio station in Reno, Nevada

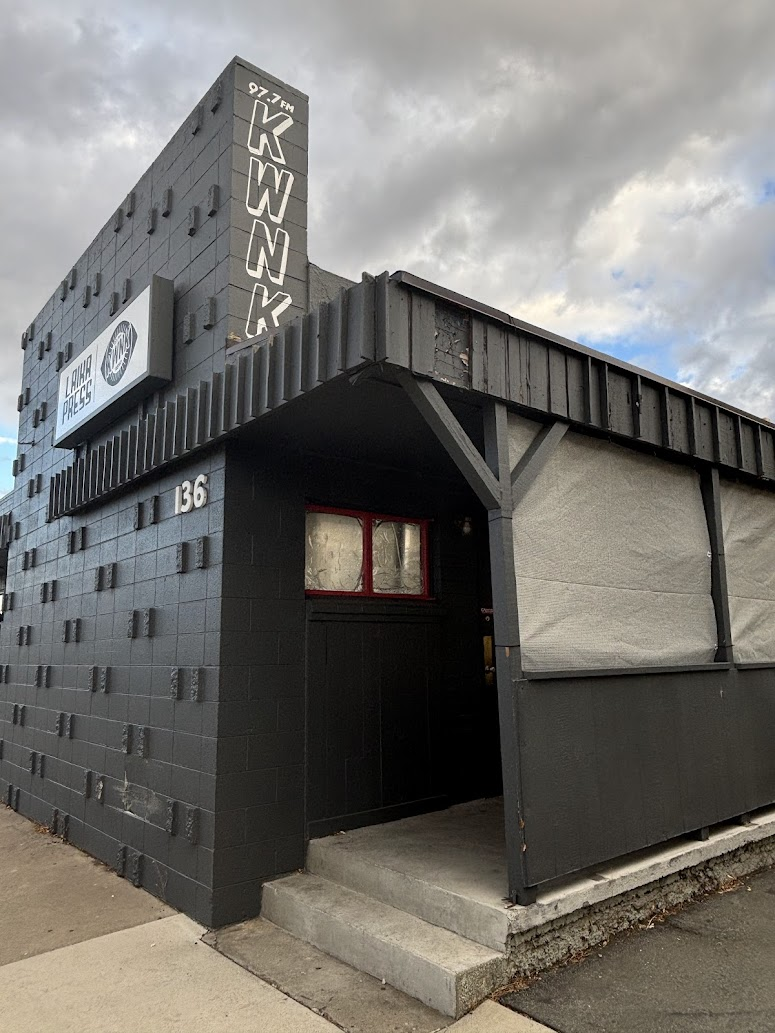

Reno, Nevada; United States
- Frequency: 97.7 MHz
- Branding: KWNK

Programming
- Format: Community radio

Ownership
- Owner: Reno Bike Project

History
- First air date: October 31, 2017
- Former call signs: KRBP-LP (2015–2016, CP)

Technical information
- Licensing authority: FCC
- Facility ID: 195719
- Class: L1
- ERP: 7 watts
- HAAT: 110 meters (360 ft)
- Transmitter coordinates: 45°35′1.68″N 122°33′51″W

Links
- Public license information: LMS
- Website: kwnkradio.org

KWNK-LP is a low power FM radio station broadcasting in Reno, Nevada, United States, at 97.7 MHz. KWNK is licensed to the Reno Bike Project and is a freeform community radio station serving the Reno area in partnership with the Holland Project and the University of Nevada Reno's online radio station, Wolf Pack Radio.

KWNK-LP began broadcasting on October 31, 2017, from 4 p.m. until 4 a.m, but now airs on a 24-hour schedule.
