= WKSH-LP =

Radio station in Shreveport, Louisiana

- Shreveport, Louisiana; United States
- Frequency: 97.7 MHz
- Branding: 97.7 Da Heat

Programming
- Format: Urban contemporary

Ownership
- Owner: Amore Entertainment Radio

Technical information
- Licensing authority: FCC
- Facility ID: 196228
- Class: L1
- ERP: 39 watts
- HAAT: 46.8 meters
- Transmitter coordinates: 32°28′13.2″N 93°47′2.6″W

Links
- Public license information: LMS
- Website: www.977daheat.com

WKSH-LP (97.7 FM) is a radio station licensed to Shreveport, Louisiana, United States. The station is currently owned by Amore Entertainment Radio.
