= WSEZ =

- Paoli, Indiana; United States
- Frequency: 1560 kHz
- Branding: Gold 98.7

Programming
- Format: Oldies

Ownership
- Owner: Diamond Shores Broadcasting, LLC
- Sister stations: WUME-FM

History
- First air date: September 28, 1964 (first license granted)

Technical information
- Licensing authority: FCC
- Facility ID: 28601
- Class: D
- Power: 250 watts
- Transmitter coordinates: type:city 38°32′25.00″N 86°28′42.00″W
- Translator: 98.7 W254CO (Paoli)

Links
- Public license information: Public file; LMS
- Webcast: Listen live
- Website: wsez987.com

WSEZ is an AM radio station broadcasting on the assigned frequency of 1560 kHz; 1560 AM is United States clear-channel frequency, on which KNZR is the dominant Class A station.

WSEZ broadcasts an oldies format and is owned by Diamond Shores Broadcasting, LLC.
