= 102.7 FM =

FM radio frequency

The following radio stations broadcast on FM frequency 102.7 MHz:

== Argentina ==
- LT3 in Rosario, Santa Fe
- Radio María in Rawson, Chubut

== Australia ==
- Sky Sports Radio in Jindabyne, New South Wales
- 3RRR in Melbourne, Victoria
- 4CCA in Cairns, Queensland
- 4DDB in Toowoomba, Queensland
- ABC Classic in Mildura, Victoria
- ABC North and West SA in Roxby Downs, South Australia
- 2RVR in Wagga Wagga, New South Wales
- Triple J in Rosebery, Tasmania

== Belgium ==
- Topradio in Aalst, Flanders

== Brazil ==
- Rádio Gaúcha (ZYD 672) in Caxias do Sul, Rio Grande do Sul
- Rádio Beach Park (ZYE 410) in Fortaleza, Ceará

== Canada (Channel 274) ==
- CBH-FM in Halifax, Nova Scotia
- CBJE-FM in Chicoutimi, Quebec
- CBMS-FM in Blanc-Sablon, Quebec
- CBTF-FM in Falkland, British Columbia
- CFGI-FM in Georgina Island, Ontario
- CJFB-FM in Caledon, Ontario
- CFOA-FM in Algonquin Park, Ontario
- CFOA-FM-1 in Algonquin Park, Ontario
- CKPK-FM in Vancouver, British Columbia
- CHOP-FM in Newmarket, Ontario
- CILU-FM in Thunder Bay, Ontario
- CITE-FM-1 in Sherbrooke, Quebec
- CIWC-FM in Ucluelet, British Columbia
- CJFN-FM in Peguis, Manitoba
- CJMV-FM in Val-d'Or, Quebec
- CJRK-FM in Scarborough, Ontario
- CKNH-FM in Norway House, Manitoba
- CKSB-6-FM in Dryden, Ontario
- VF2463 in Fort Alexander, Manitoba
- CKMS-FM in Waterloo, Ontario

== China ==
- CNR The Voice of China in Huanren
- Radio Guangzhou Golden Radio in Guangzhou

== Ireland ==
- Spin South West in Limerick
- RTÉ Raidió na Gaeltachta in the Northeast

== Mexico ==
- XEHL-FM in Guadalajara, Jalisco
- XHAC-FM in Campeche, Campeche
- XHCANQ-FM in Cancún (Santa Martha), Quintana Roo
- XHCHG-FM in Chilpancingo, Guerrero
- XHCSCM-FM in Mérida, Yucatán
- XHDM-FM in Hermosillo, Sonora
- XHGAS-FM in Cuatro Ciénegas, Coahuila
- XHHW-FM in Las Garzas, El Rosario, Sonora
- XHIRG-FM in Irapuato, Guanajuato
- XHJBT-FM in San Juan Bautista Tuxtepec, Oaxaca
- XHPQUI-FM in Tequisquiapan, Querétaro
- XHPR-FM in Poza Rica, Veracruz
- XHSCBJ-FM in Maravatio, Michoacan
- XHQT-FM in Nogales, Sonora
- XHRCA-FM in Torreón, Coahuila
- XHTCH-FM in Tapachula, Chiapas

== Netherlands ==
- Radio 538 in Rotterdam and Emmen

== Philippines ==
- DWSM in Metro Manila
- DWJZ in Polangui, Albay
- DYUP in Miagao, Iloilo
- DYES-FM in Cebu City
- DXYP in Davao City
- DXHT in Zamboanga City
- DXVC in Cotabato City

== Malaysia ==
- IKIMfm in Ipoh, Perak and Seremban, Negeri Sembilan

== South Africa ==
- Classic FM (South Africa) in Johannesburg

== United States (Channel 274) ==
- KBBQ in Van Buren, Arkansas
- KBIQ in Manitou Springs, Colorado
- KBLZ in Winona, Texas
- KBYH-LP in Midland, Texas
- KCHW in Chewelah, Washington
- KCNA in Cave Junction, Oregon
- KDDB in Waipahu, Hawaii
- KGQD-LP in Kermit, Texas
- KHGE in Fresno, California
- KHXS in Merkel, Texas
- KHYX in Winnemucca, Nevada
- KIEV-LP in Camas, Washington
- KIIS in Los Angeles, California
- KINX in Fairfield, Montana
- KJNA-FM in Jena, Louisiana
- KJOK in Hollis, Oklahoma
- KJXK in San Antonio, Texas
- KJYO in Oklahoma City, Oklahoma
- KKRO in Citrus Heights, California
- KLDG in Liberal, Kansas
- KNTN in Thief River Falls, Minnesota
- KORD in Richland, Washington
- KPGZ-LP in Kearney, Missouri
- KQHM in Zapata, Texas
- KQUL in Lake Ozark, Missouri
- KRNN in Juneau, Alaska
- KSL in Midvale, Utah
- KTBH-FM in Kurtistown, Hawaii
- KTIG in Pequot Lakes, Minnesota
- KTXJ-FM in Jasper, Texas
- KVGS in Boulder City, Nevada
- KVSS (FM) in Papillion, Nebraska
- KWLT in North Crossett, Arkansas
- KWVF in Guerneville, California
- KXMZ in Box Elder, South Dakota
- KYBB in Canton, South Dakota
- KYGT-LP in Idaho Springs, Colorado
- KYTC (FM) in Northwood, Iowa
- KYTE in Independence, Oregon
- KZMG in Melba, Idaho
- WAOR in Ligonier, Indiana
- WBDX in Trenton, Georgia
- WBOW in Terre Haute, Indiana
- WCHS-LP in Sylvester, Georgia
- WCKS in Fruithurst, Alabama
- WCNG in Murphy, North Carolina
- WCPZ in Sandusky, Ohio
- WDKL in Mount Clemens, Michigan
- WEBN in Cincinnati, Ohio
- WEGR in Arlington, Tennessee
- WEKX in Jellico, Tennessee
- WEQX in Manchester, Vermont
- WERI in Wattsburg, Pennsylvania
- WGNI in Wilmington, North Carolina
- WGUS in New Ellenton, South Carolina
- WGYE in Mannington, West Virginia
- WHKR in Rockledge, Florida
- WICX-LP in Concord, New Hampshire
- WIEC-LP in Eau Claire, Wisconsin
- WJCF-LP in Doerun, Georgia
- WJEQ in Macomb, Illinois
- WJJX in Appomattox, Virginia
- WJTR-LP in Ashburn, Georgia
- WKBH-FM in La Crescent, Minnesota
- WKSB in Williamsport, Pennsylvania
- WKWY in Tompkinsville, Kentucky
- WLGZ in Webster, New York
- WLME in Lewisport, Kentucky
- WLMP-LP in Fredericksburg, Virginia
- WLRB in Ocean City, New Jersey
- WLYK in Cape Vincent, New York
- WMJL in Marion, Kentucky
- WMOM in Pentwater, Michigan
- WMXJ in Pompano Beach, Florida
- WMYW-LP in Paulding, Ohio
- WNEW-FM in New York, New York
- WNPE in Narragansett Pier, Rhode Island
- WOKH in Springfield, Kentucky
- WOPA-LP in Clio, South Carolina
- WPHK in Blountstown, Florida
- WPMA in Buckhead, Georgia
- WPUB in Camden, South Carolina
- WQSR in Baltimore, Maryland
- WRVM in Suring, Wisconsin
- WSGF-LP in Bloomingdale, Georgia
- WUFR-LP in Umatilla, Florida
- WUGC-LP in Pelham, Georgia
- WVAZ in Oak Park, Illinois
- WVEK in Weber City, Virginia
- WVSR in Charleston, West Virginia
- WWFA in St. Florian, Alabama
- WXBM in Milton, Florida
- WXHT in Madison, Florida
- WXIO-LP in Ridge Manor, Florida
- WYSC in Mcrae, Georgia
- WZZT in Morrison, Illinois

== United Kingdom ==
- Heart East in Peterborough
- BBC Radio Leeds in Keighley, West Yorkshire
- Heart South in Reigate & Crawley
- Radio Skye in Isle of Skye

== Vietnam ==
- VOV3 in Hanoi
