= 1270 AM =

AM radio frequency

The following radio stations broadcast on AM frequency 1270 kHz: 1270 AM is a Regional broadcast frequency.

== In Argentina ==
- LRA20 in Las Lomitas
- LS11 Provincia in La Plata, Buenos Aires

== In Canada ==
- CJCB in Sydney, Nova Scotia - 10 kW, transmitter located at 46.1806°N 60.1908°W

== In Guatemala ==
- TGCQ in Guatemala City, Guatemala

== In Mexico ==
- XEAZ-AM in Tijuana, Baja California
- XEGL-AM in Navojoa, Sonora
- XETGME-AM in Gómez Palacio, Durango

== In Norway ==
- Arctic Outpost Radio in Longyearbyen, Svalbard

== In the United States ==
Call sign	City of license	Facility ID	Class	Daytime power (kW)	Nighttime power (kW)	Unlimited power (kW)	Transmitter coordinates
KAJO	Grants Pass, Oregon	24822	D	10	0.048		42.437778°N 123.3575°W
KDJI	Holbrook, Arizona	47887	D	5	0.13		34.905833°N 110.190278°W
KEDO	Longview, Washington	2814	D	5	0.083		46.183056°N 122.958056°W
KFAN	Rochester, Minnesota	35526	B	5	1		43.979722°N 92.4475°W
KFLC	Benbrook, Texas	34298	B	50	5		32.726667°N 97.191667°W
KFSQ	Thousand Palms, California	14056	B	5	0.75		33.851111°N 116.393333°W
KIIK	Waynesville, Missouri	4260	D	0.5	0.044		37.828333°N 92.174167°W
KINN	Alamogordo, New Mexico	32997	D	1	0.08		32.886944°N 105.951111°W
KLXX	Bismarck-Mandan, North Dakota	43223	B	1	0.25		46.810278°N 100.836111°W
KNDI	Honolulu, Hawaii	37065	B			5	21.323889°N 157.879722°W
KNWC	Sioux Falls, South Dakota	49774	B	5	2.3		43.285278°N 96.764722°W
KRXO	Claremore, Oklahoma	50215	B	5	1		36.265278°N 95.710278°W
KSCB	Liberal, Kansas	59803	D	5	0.025		37.059444°N 100.901389°W
KTFI	Twin Falls, Idaho	69857	B	5	0.86		42.543333°N 114.470556°W
KVMI	Tulare, California	71716	B	5	1		36.168333°N 119.253333°W
KXBX	Lakeport, California	49201	D	0.5	0.097		39.013889°N 122.894167°W
KYSJ	St. Joseph, Missouri	50511	D	1	0.036		39.744167°N 94.787778°W
WACM	Springfield, Massachusetts	18717	B	1	0.35		42.09°N 72.603056°W
WAIN	Columbia, Kentucky	67857	D	1	0.068		37.107222°N 85.278333°W
WBOJ	Columbus, Georgia	36685	D	5	0.237		32.465°N 85.022778°W
WCBC	Cumberland, Maryland	14717	B	5	1		39.674444°N 78.78°W
WCGC	Belmont, North Carolina	27218	B	10	0.5		35.251389°N 81.057222°W
WCMR	Elkhart, Indiana	53650	B	5	1		41.621111°N 85.961111°W
WDLA	Walton, New York	16443	D	5	0.089		42.136111°N 75.08°W
WDLR	Marysville, Ohio	29636	B	0.5	0.5		40.246111°N 83.330556°W
WGSV	Guntersville, Alabama	25675	D	1	0.124		34.308611°N 86.295556°W
WHEO	Stuart, Virginia	46335	D	5			36.623611°N 80.263889°W
WHGS	Hampton, South Carolina	25916	B	10	0.219		32.843889°N 81.125556°W
WIJD	Prichard, Alabama	53144	D	5	0.103		30.745833°N 88.094167°W
WILE	Cambridge, Ohio	3363	D	0.83	0.028		40.039444°N 81.646667°W
WIWA	Eatonville, Florida	57931	B	25	5		28.5675°N 81.427222°W
WJJC	Commerce, Georgia	73141	D	1	0.173		34.215833°N 83.435833°W
WLBR	Lebanon, Pennsylvania	36874	B	5	1		40.359722°N 76.458333°W
WLIK	Newport, Tennessee	73208	B	5	0.5		35.963611°N 83.208611°W
WMKT	Charlevoix, Michigan	215	B	27	5		45.272778°N 85.252222°W
WMPM	Smithfield, North Carolina	9051	D	5	0.145		35.525833°N 78.333611°W
WPMH	Newport News, Virginia	3533	B	1.5	0.9		37.031111°N 76.366667°W
WQKR	Portland, Tennessee	6663	D	1	0.043		36.611111°N 86.581111°W
WRJC	Mauston, Wisconsin	73957	D	0.5	0.027		43.831111°N 90.080833°W
WTLY	Tallahassee, Florida	51592	D	5	0.11		30.428889°N 84.328611°W
WTSN	Dover, New Hampshire	23254	B	5	5		43.183611°N 70.853889°W
WUSW	Niagara Falls, New York	7822	B	5	1		42.744722°N 78.886944°W
WVLT	Vineland, New Jersey	11973	B	0.36	0.21		39.498056°N 75.075278°W
WWCA	Gary, Indiana	41332	B	1	1		41.527778°N 87.376667°W
WWWI	Baxter, Minnesota	67359	D	5	0.045		46.298611°N 94.278333°W
WXGO	Madison, Indiana	17624	D	1	0.058		38.741111°N 85.361389°W
WXYT	Detroit, Michigan	28627	B	50	50		42.0275°N 83.345°W
