= Mass media in Liberal, Kansas =

Liberal, Kansas is a center of media in southwestern Kansas. The following is a list of media outlets based in the city.

== Print ==
=== Newspapers ===
- Crusader, bi-weekly, the Seward County Community College student newspaper
- El Lider, weekly
- Leader & Times, daily
- Liberal Light, weekly

== Radio ==
The following radio stations are licensed to and/or broadcast from Liberal:

=== AM ===
Frequency	Callsign	Format	City of License	Notes
1270	KSCB	News/Talk	Liberal, Kansas	-
1470	KSMM	Christian Contemporary	Liberal, Kansas	-

=== FM ===
Frequency	Callsign	Format	City of License	Notes
91.5	KYEH	Religious	Liberal, Kansas	-
96.3	K242AK	Public	Liberal, Kansas	NPR; Translator of KANZ, Garden City, Kansas
100.5	K263AQ	Rock	Liberal, Kansas	Translator of KKBS, Guymon, Oklahoma
101.5	KSMM-FM	Regional Mexican	Liberal, Kansas	-
102.7	KLDG	Country	Liberal, Kansas	-
105.1	KZQD	Religious	Liberal, Kansas	Spanish language
107.5	KSCB-FM	Hot Adult Contemporary	Liberal, Kansas	-

== Television ==
Liberal is in the Wichita-Hutchinson, Kansas television market.

The following television stations are licensed to and/or broadcast from Liberal:

Display Channel	Network	Callsign	City of License	Notes
23.1	Retro TV	KSWE-LD	Liberal, Kansas	Translator of KDGL-LD, Sublette, Kansas
23.2	Tuff TV	KSWE-LD	Liberal, Kansas	Translator of KDGL-LD, Sublette, Kansas
23.3	AMGTV	KSWE-LD	Liberal, Kansas	Translator of KDGL-LD, Sublette, Kansas
23.4	Launch TV	KSWE-LD	Liberal, Kansas	Translator of KDGL-LD, Sublette, Kansas
23.5	TheWalk TV	KSWE-LD	Liberal, Kansas	Translator of KDGL-LD, Sublette, Kansas
23.6	PBJ	KSWE-LD	Liberal, Kansas	Translator of KDGL-LD, Sublette, Kansas
