= Keith Jamieson =

Australian singer-songwriter (1948–2022)

Keith Jamieson OAM
- Also known as: Jammo
- Born: 21 March 1948; Goondiwindi, Queensland, Australia
- Died: 12 August 2022 (aged 74) Rockhampton, Queensland, Australia
- Genres: Australian country music
- Occupation: Singer-songwriter

Keith Ross Jamieson OAM (21 March 1948 – 12 August 2022) was an Australian country music singer-songwriter.

Best known for his bush ballads, Jamieson released numerous albums throughout his 40+ year career in the Australian country music industry including Troy's Memory, The Year 2000 Australian Bushman, Bush Ballads Forever, A Picture of Australia, Looking Back Along The Track, Jammo: The Early Years 'til Now and the EP, The Ballad of Mulga Dan.

== Career ==
Jamieson was born in Goondiwindi, Queensland on 21 March 1948, to Ross Jamieson and Esme Jamieson (née Cunningham), and was the eldest of eight children.

Growing up, he was a fan of Slim Dusty, Buddy Williams and Tex Morton, and was influenced by bush balladeers Stan Coster, Tony Brooks, Tom Oliver and Joe Daly. He went to his first concert in 1956 when he attended the Rick and Thel Carey Show.

Throughout his life, Jamieson worked at various jobs starting in 1963 when he was employed on Listowell Valley Station, south of Blackall, initially as a cowboy gardener but then as a ringer. He also drove road trains, worked in coal mines, drove taxis and was employed as a security guard.

In 1979, Jamieson recorded his first songs, "Capella Rodeo" and "Country Music Man", both produced by Barry Thornton, and then started touring in 1982.

In 1983, he released "Winton's Outback Festival" and "The Oil Rig Man", which was followed by Coal Minin' Man and Aussie Christmas in 1986 and then "The Legend of Dundee" in 1987. Throughout the 1990's, Jamieson continued to release music including "Dreamtime Country" and "The Drought of the 90's".

In 1994, a song which he wrote called "The Blue Gumtree Ball" was recorded by Slim Dusty and released on Dusty's studio album Natural High which Jamieson considered to be a career highlight.

In 1999, he released the compilation album The Year 2000 Australian Bushman which was followed by Bush Ballads Forever in 2000.

After Jamieson's son Troy was killed at the age of 29 in an accident at Toowoomba in 1997, Jamieson released the album Troy's Memory in 2002 with the first single, "One Tree Plain", peaking at #6 on the Australian country music charts. Also that year, Jamieson's song "The Ghost of Three Rivers" was recorded by Jeff Brown which won Traditional Bush Ballad of the Year at the Tamworth Songwriters Awards in 2003. This was followed by the album A Picture of Australia in 2004.

Following Jamieson's retirement from the mining industry, he commenced touring around Australia full-time with his partner Alisha Smith and their daughter Caitlyn Jamieson who was born in 2006, both of whom he also released several collaborative albums with such as Our Bush Ballad Family, Rhythm 'N' Rhyme and Plain and Simple Drifter. The trio often performed together at country music events around Australia.

From 2006, he lived in Bouldercombe, where he instigated the first 'Bouldy Bush Ballad Bash' in 2008 which became an annual community event. As a songwriter, he wrote the song "I Love Australia" which won Jamieson and performer Jeff Brown a Golden Guitar Award in 2014 for 'Bush Ballad of the Year' at the Country Music Awards of Australia in Tamworth.

Jamieson became known for helping organise country music festivals to celebrate the genre and to promote upcoming talent. In 2011, he instigated the first Yellowbelly Country Music Festival in St George, and in 2018, organised the first Cunnamulla Poets and Country Music Muster.

In 2018, Jamieson performed at a special bush ballads concert in Tamworth which was held to raise money for Dolly's Dream Foundation following the death of teenage cyberbullying victim Dolly Everett.

In 2019, he released a family album, entitled Memories Within.

== Community radio ==
In the 1980s, Jamieson was an on air presenter at 4DDB in Toowoomba, and was subsequently responsible for establishing a community radio station in Blackwater in 1998 called 92.7 FM (callsign: 4BCB) which he managed until moving to Bouldercombe in 2006. In 2012, he joined Rockhampton community station 4YOU as an on air presenter, hosting a program called Bush Ballads Australia.

== Honours ==
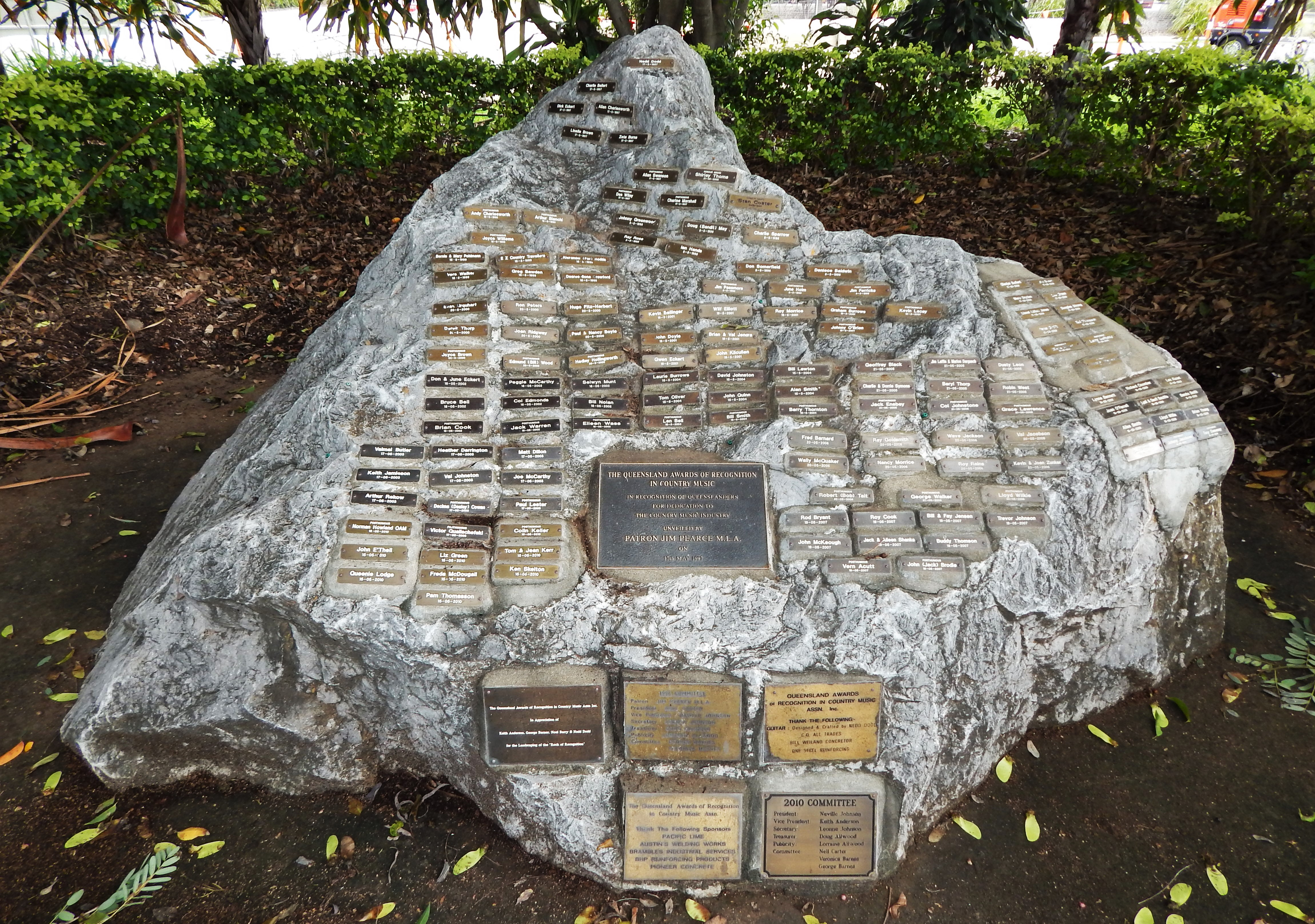
The Country Music 'Rock of Recognition' at the Rockhampton Heritage Village, to which Jamieson's name was added in 2003

In 2003, Jamieson received a Queensland Award of Recognition in Country Music and his name was added to the Country Music 'Rock of Recognition', located at the Rockhampton Heritage Village in Parkhurst.

In 2005, Jamieson was inducted into Tamworth's Hands of Fame.

Jamieson was named in the 2020 Queen's Birthday Honours and was awarded a Medal of the Order of Australia for his services to country music and the community.

== Death ==
After battling several illnesses for 15 months, Jamieson died at the Rockhampton Mater Hospital on 12 August 2022.

Jamieson's death prompted various tributes including on Early Morning Country on ABC Local Radio and ABC Country.

== Awards ==
=== CMAA Awards ===
These annual awards have been presented since 1973 and have been organised by Country Music Association of Australia (CMAA) from 1993, to "encourage, promote and recognise excellence in Australian country music recording". From that time the recipient's trophy has been a Golden Guitar.

Year	Nominee / work	Award	Result (wins only)
2005	Keith Jamieson	Hands of Fame	imprinted
2014	"I Love Australia" (with Jeff Brown)	Bush Ballad of the Year	Won

=== Tamworth Songwriters Awards ===
The Tamworth Songwriters Association (TSA) is an annual songwriting contest for original country songs, awarded in January at the Tamworth Country Music Festival. They commenced in 1986. Keith Jamieson has won three awards since that time.

Year	Nominee / work	Award	Result (wins only)
2003	"The Ghost of Three Rivers" by Keith Jamieson and Stan Coster	Traditional Bush Ballad of the Year	Won
2013	"My First Rodeo" by Keith Jamieson and Bill Cosbie	Country Ballad of the Year	Won
2016	"Plain and Simple" by Keith Jamieson	Commemorative Award for Bush Ballad	Won
