= WRJC =

WRJC may refer to:

- WRJC (AM), a radio station (1270 AM) licensed to Mauston, Wisconsin, United States
- WRJC-FM, a radio station (92.1 FM) licensed to Mauston, Wisconsin, United States
