= KSCB =

KSCB may refer to:

- KSCB (AM), a radio station (1270 AM) licensed to Liberal, Kansas, United States
- KSCB-FM, a radio station (107.5 FM) licensed to Liberal, Kansas, United States
- K53EG, a television station (channel 53) licensed to Sioux Falls, South Dakota, United States, also known as KSCB-TV
- Scribner State Airport (ICAO code KSCB)
