= WHGS =

WHGS may refer to:

- WHGS (AM), radio station in South Carolina
- WHGS (Maine), a defunct radio station in Houlton, Maine
- William Hulme's Grammar School, school in Manchester
