= WUFR =

WUFR may refer to:

- WUFR-LP, a low-power radio station (102.7 FM) licensed to serve Umatilla, Florida, United States
- WCOX (FM), a radio station (91.1 FM) licensed to serve Bedford, Pennsylvania, United States, which held the WUFR call sign from 2005 to 2021
