= KRVT =

KRVT may refer to:

- KRVT-LP, a low-power radio station (99.9 FM) licensed to serve Rancho Viejo, Texas, United States
- KRXO (AM), a radio station (1270 AM) licensed to serve Claremore, Oklahoma, United States, which held the call sign KRVT from 2000 to 2014
