= KRXO =

KRXO may refer to:

- KRXO (AM), a radio station (1270 AM) licensed to serve Claremore, Oklahoma, United States
- KRXO-FM, a radio station (107.7 FM) licensed to serve Oklahoma City, Oklahoma
