= KCVD =

KCVD may refer to:

- KCVD-LP, a defunct low-power radio station (94.7 FM) formerly licensed to serve Castle Valley, Utah, United States
- KIEV-LP, a low-power radio station (102.7 FM) licensed to serve Camas, Washington, United States, which held the call sign KCVD-LP from 2014 to 2015
- KQLZ (FM), a radio station (95.7 FM) licensed to serve Beulah, North Dakota, United States, which held the call sign KCVD from 2006 to 2012
