= Dreamtime Cultural Centre =

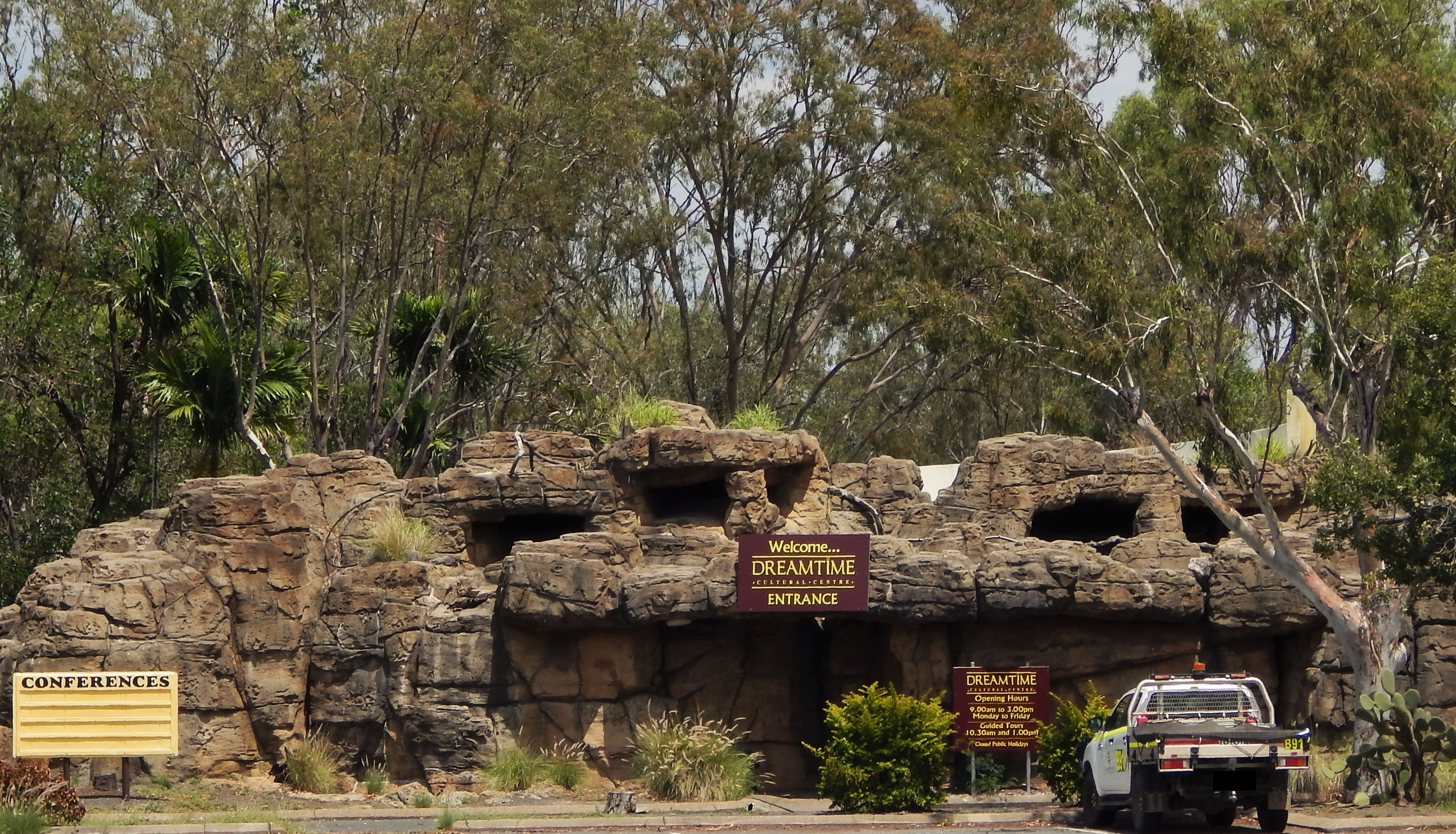
- Exterior of Dreamtime Cultural Centre, 2021

General information
- Address: 703-751 Yaamba Road
- Town or city: Rockhampton, Queensland
- Country: Australia
- Coordinates: 23°18′56″S 150°30′56″E
- Opened: 9 April 1988

Website
- www.dreamtimecentre.com.au

The Dreamtime Cultural Centre is an Indigenous cultural arts and education centre in Rockhampton, Queensland, Australia.

Situated on the Bruce Highway in the suburb of Parkhurst at the northern entrance to the city, the centre was established to promote greater awareness of local Aboriginal and Torres Strait Islander culture, history and traditions through various cultural displays, guided educational tours and interactive activities.

The Dreamtime Cultural Centre is also a popular attraction for tourists visiting Rockhampton with many European and Australian backpackers visiting the centre each year.

== History ==
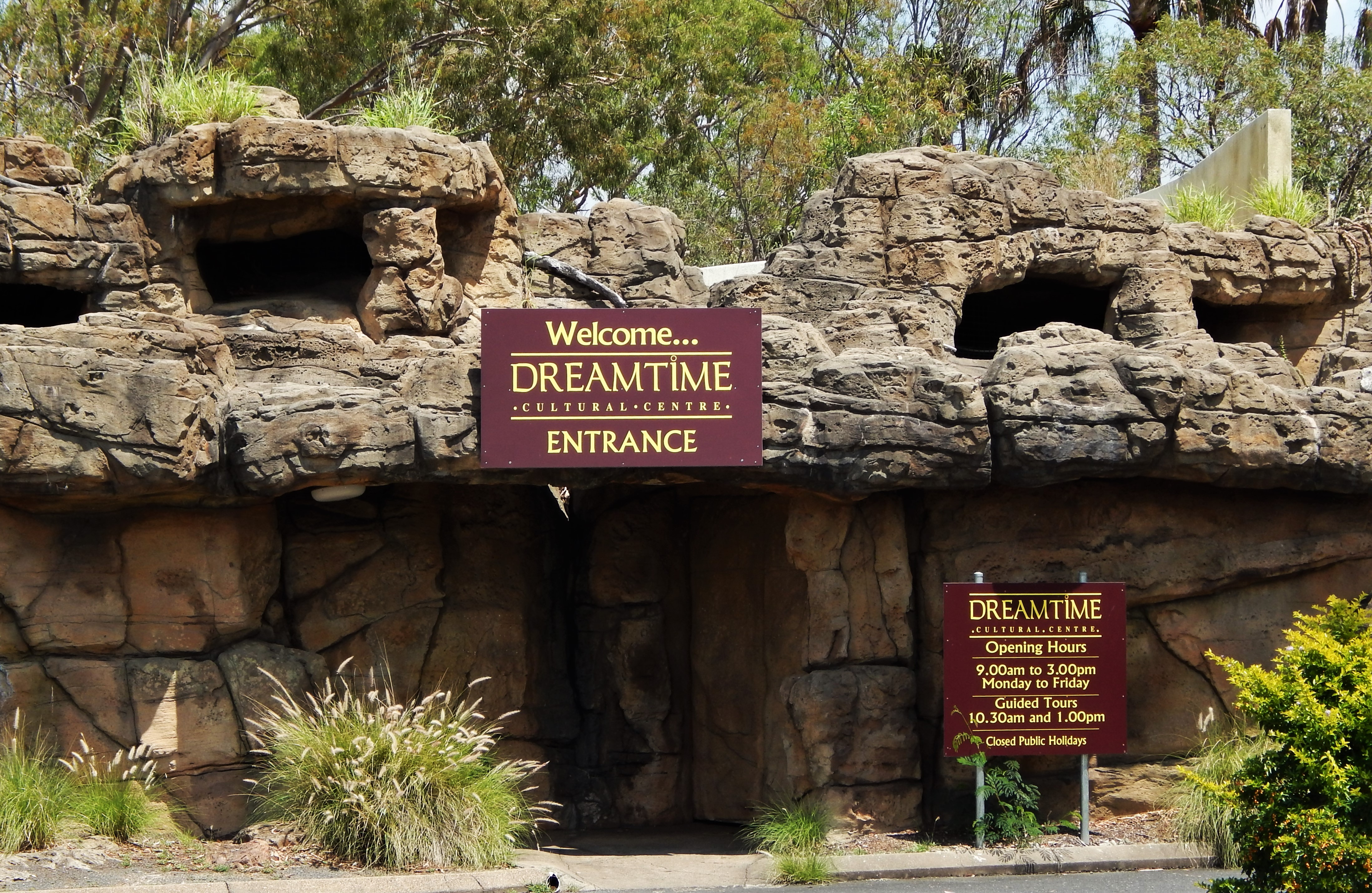
Entrance to Rockhampton's Dreamtime Cultural Centre, 2021

Following a visit to Canberra in 1983 by representatives of the Central Queensland Aboriginal Corporation for Cultural Activities, Nola James and Ted Mitchell, funding submissions for centre were lodged with the Aboriginal Development Commission and Federal Minister for Aboriginal Affairs, Clyde Holding.

At the time, the centre was estimated to cost approximately $2 million, with Rockhampton City Council agreeing to donate the land at Parkhurst for the purpose of constructing the complex.

The Dreamtime Cultural Centre was developed as a Bicentennial Project and upon completion was officially opened by Australian Prime Minister Bob Hawke on 9 April 1988.

Later that year, the Torres Strait Islander complex at the centre was officially opened by George Mye on 5 November 1988.

With the completion of another expansion at the Dreamtime Cultural Centre, the Dugong Complex was officially opened by Katharine, Duchess of Kent on 1 March 1992.

The Dreamtime Cultural Centre's Darumbal Convention Centre was officially opened by Lois O'Donoghue on 7 August 1994.

The late Nola James and Ted Mitchell, who are credited with much of the lobbying in the 1980s to have the centre established are both honoured at the Dreamtime Cultural Centre, with the main building at the complex named the Nola James Building and with a museum called the Ted Mitchell Gallery, which houses the Vanishing Culture of the Sandstone Belt display.

In 2004, a short film, written and directed by Wayne Blair, was produced at the centre called Dramatically Black - The Djarns Djarns: Shake a leg.

The Dreamtime Cultural Centre celebrated its 20th anniversary in 2008.

In 2012, Australian rugby league player Johnathan Thurston visited the centre to speak to high school students and to promote the FOGS ARTIE program, which is aimed to achieve results through Indigenous education.

A special Federal Court of Australia sitting was held at the Dreamtime Cultural Centre on 22 June 2016 where Federal Court judge, Justice Berna Collier handed down the Darumbal People Native Title Consent, determining that the Darumbal people were the legally recognised traditional owners of 2500 square kilometres of land in Central Queensland, incorporating Rockhampton, Yeppoon and Marlborough and the surrounding areas.

The Dreamtime Cultural Centre celebrated its 30th anniversary in 2018.

In 2020, a number of government, business and community representatives met to discuss the future of the Dreamtime Cultural Centre in a bid for the centre to remain relevant.

== See also ==
- Townsville Aboriginal and Torres Strait Islander Cultural Centre
