= WBRT =

- Bardstown, Kentucky; United States
- Frequency: 1320 kHz
- Branding: Hometown Radio WBRT

Programming
- Format: Country music
- Affiliations: Motor Racing Network; Performance Racing Network

Ownership
- Owner: Bardstown Radio Team, LLC
- Sister stations: WOKH

History
- First air date: January 5, 1955
- Call sign meaning: Bardstown Radio Team (owner)

Technical information
- Licensing authority: FCC
- Facility ID: 48244
- Class: D
- Power: 1,050 watts day 44 watts night
- Transmitter coordinates: 37°49′9″N 85°29′10″W
- Translators: W235DB (94.9 MHz, Lebanon); W246AT (97.1 MHz, Bardstown)

Links
- Public license information: Public file; LMS
- Webcast: Listen Live
- Website: wbrtcountry.com

WBRT (1320 AM) is a country music–formatted radio station licensed to and serving Bardstown, Kentucky, United States. The station is currently owned by Bardstown Radio Team as part of a duopoly with Springfield–licensed adult contemporary station WOKH (102.7 FM). Both stations share studios on South Third Street in downtown Bardstown, while WBRT's transmitter facilities are located off Sunset Drive in the northwest part of town.

== History ==
What became WBRT was first a construction permit for an AM station licensed to Springfield, Kentucky, allocated to a movie theater chain owner Andy Anderson. Anderson later had the city of license moved to Bardstown and the station first went on the air January 5, 1955. After just two years, WBRT would be sold to Lawrence Adams before being sold to a group of investors under the name Nelson County Broadcasters in 1966. By 1979, the station would come to be principally owned by long-time staff member Tom Isaac, who would lead WBRT to launch a companion station on the FM band as WOKH (96.7 FM; now Lebanon Junction–licensed WLEZ 99.3).

In 1997, WBRT and WOKH were sold to Glasgow, Kentucky–based Commonwealth Broadcasting. Commonwealth would later sell the station to current owners Bardstown Radio Team in 2009. The new group would later purchase the new WOKH (102.7 FM) of Springfield, Kentucky from Choice Radio in 2017.

== Programming ==
WBRT features local programming in addition to its country music. WBRT also carries NASCAR races from the Cup Series and Xfinity Series through the sport's two syndicated radio networks–Motor Racing Network and Performance Racing Network.

== Translators ==
In addition to the main station, WBRT is relayed by two additional translators to widen its broadcast area:

Broadcast translators for WBRT
Call sign	Frequency	City of license	FID	ERP (W)	HAAT	Class	Transmitter coordinates	FCC info
W235DB	94.9 FM	Lebanon, Kentucky	202245	250	54 m (177 ft)	D	37°33′5″N 85°17′21″W	LMS
W246AT	97.1 FM	Bardstown, Kentucky	145097	250	52.6 m (173 ft)	D	37°49′9″N 85°29′10″W	LMS
