= XHIRG-FM =

Radio station in Irapuato, Guanajuato

- Irapuato, Guanajuato; Mexico
- Frequency: 102.7 FM
- Branding: Campirana

Programming
- Format: Regional Mexican

Ownership
- Owner: Grupo Radiorama; (XEIRG-AM, S.A. de C.V.)

History
- First air date: November 30, 1994 (concession)
- Call sign meaning: IRapuato Guanajuato

Technical information
- ERP: 3 kW
- Transmitter coordinates: 20°44′03″N 101°22′06″W

Links
- Website: campirana.mx

XHIRG-FM is a radio station on 102.7 FM in Irapuato, Guanajuato. XHIRG is owned by Grupo Radiorama and carries a Regional Mexican format known as Campirana.

== History ==
XHIRG began as XEIRG-AM 1590, a daytimer, in November 1994. It was moved to 1470 in 2007.

It was approved to migrate to FM in 2011 as XHIRG-FM on 102.7.
