= WMPM =

- Smithfield, North Carolina; United States
- Broadcast area: Raleigh-Durham
- Frequency: 1270 kHz
- Branding: El Gallo

Programming
- Format: Regional Mexican

Ownership
- Owner: Steven Lara; (Gorilla Broadcasting Company, LLC)
- Sister stations: WNMB

History
- First air date: 1950

Technical information
- Licensing authority: FCC
- Facility ID: 9051
- Class: D
- Power: 5,000 watts (day); 145 watts (night)
- Transmitter coordinates: 35°31′33.00″N 78°20′1.00″W
- Translator: 94.3 W232DO (Smithfield)

Links
- Public license information: Public file; LMS
- Webcast: Listen live
- Website: elgallonc.com

WMPM (1270 AM) is a commercial radio station licensed to Smithfield, North Carolina. WMPM is owned by Steven Lara, through licensee Gorilla Broadcasting Company, LLC. Its studios and offices are on Buffalo Road in Smithfield.

By day, WMPM is powered at 5,000 watts non-directional. To protect other stations on 1270 AM from interference, at night it reduces power to 140 watts. Programming is also heard on 200-watt FM translator W232DO at 94.3 MHz in Smithfield, Selma, and Clayton. WMPM 1270AM covers the Raleigh market.

== History ==
The station signed on the air in 1950. Originally it was a daytimer, required to go off the air at sunset.

WMPM has been heavily focused on Johnston County and originally had a full service, classic country format, with an occasional Southern gospel song thrown in every now and then. It was previously owned by broadcaster Carl Lamm, who held onto the station for nearly a half-century and later hosted a weekday afternoon show on sister station 1090 WTSB in Selma, North Carolina. In addition, Carl is a member of the North Carolina Broadcasters Hall of Fame.

On November 1, 2007, the classic country and Southern gospel programming heard on 1270 moved down the dial to WTSB, another Johnston County station, which previously had an all-sports format.

Beginning in 2009, WMPM began broadcasting Contemporary Christian music, billing itself as "The New 1270 WMPM, Johnston County's Christian Radio.". The station signed off and went silent on February 28, 2019, following the owner's retirement.

Effective December 6, 2019, Carl Lamm sold WMPM and translator W232DO to Jimmy Johnson's Johnson Broadcast Ventures, Ltd. for $155,000. Johnson put the station back on the air with an urban oldies and urban gospel format.
