= XHPQUI-FM (Querétaro) =

Radio station in Tequisquiapan, Querétaro, Mexico

- Tequisquiapan, Querétaro; Mexico
- Frequency: 102.7 FM (HD Radio)
- Branding: K Digital

Programming
- Format: Romantic/pop

Ownership
- Owner: Servicios de Cines y Espectáculos, S.A. de C.V.

History
- First air date: June 2018
- Call sign meaning: TeQUIsquiapan

Technical information
- Class: A
- ERP: 1.25 kW
- HAAT: 371.4 m
- Transmitter coordinates: 20°30′36″N 99°58′54″W

Links
- Webcast: Listen live
- Website: kdigital.mx

XHPQUI-FM is a radio station on 102.7 FM in Tequisquiapan, Querétaro, Mexico. It is known as K Digital and broadcasts from a tower on Cerro La Trinidad.

XHPQUI-FM broadcasts in HD.

== History ==
XHPQUI was awarded in the IFT-4 radio auction of 2017 and came to air in June 2018.
