= Rockhampton Heritage Village =

The Rockhampton Heritage Village Museum
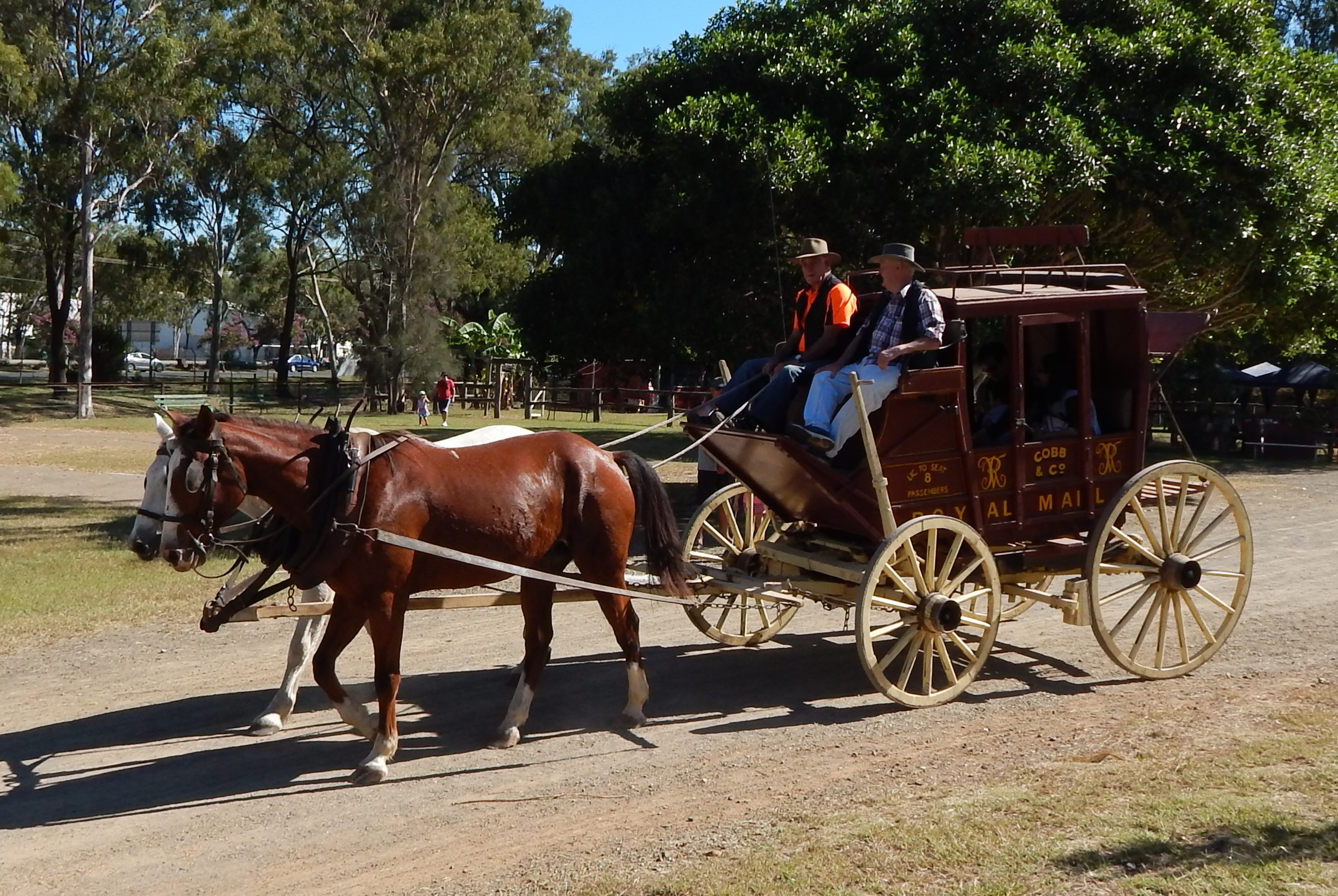
- Cobb & Co coach at Rockhampton Heritage Village, 2014
- Established: 8 May 1998
- Location: Parkhurst, Queensland
- Coordinates: 23°18′24″S 150°30′57″E
- Type: open air museum
- Owner: Rockhampton Regional Council
- Website: www.rockhamptonregion.qld.gov.au/FacilitiesRecreation/Heritage-Village

The Rockhampton Heritage Village is a tourist attraction and multipurpose venue located in Rockhampton, Queensland, Australia.

Situated on corner of the Bruce Highway and Boundary Road in the suburb of Parkhurst, it was officially opened by Rockhampton City Council mayor Jim MacRae and Federal Member for Capricornia Paul Marek on 8 May 1998.

Laid out as a township museum on 11.4 hectares of land, the Rockhampton Heritage Village consists of approximately 40 buildings, with a mixture of both original historical buildings or replicas which have been preserved or designed to focus on the history of Central Queensland since European settlement.

The attraction is mainly run by volunteers from the organisation Friends of the Heritage Village, but a small number of paid Rockhampton Regional Council employees also work on site.

== History ==
The Rockhampton Heritage Village originated from a privately owned collection of memorabilia which had been displayed at what was known as the Gangalook Museum near The Caves, approximately 15 kilometres north of the present site.

The Gangalook Museum was donated in its entirety to Rockhampton City Council in 1989 and the collection was relocated to its current site in Parkhurst in 1997, opening the following year as the Rockhampton Heritage Village as an initiative of the council and community sponsors.

The collection has continued to grow since 1998, with numerous historical buildings added or replicas constructed on site.

The site has since become one of the city's flagship tourist attractions. In 2019, it was reported that it was listed as the second most popular attraction within the Rockhampton Region, with a 4.5 star rating on Tripadvisor.

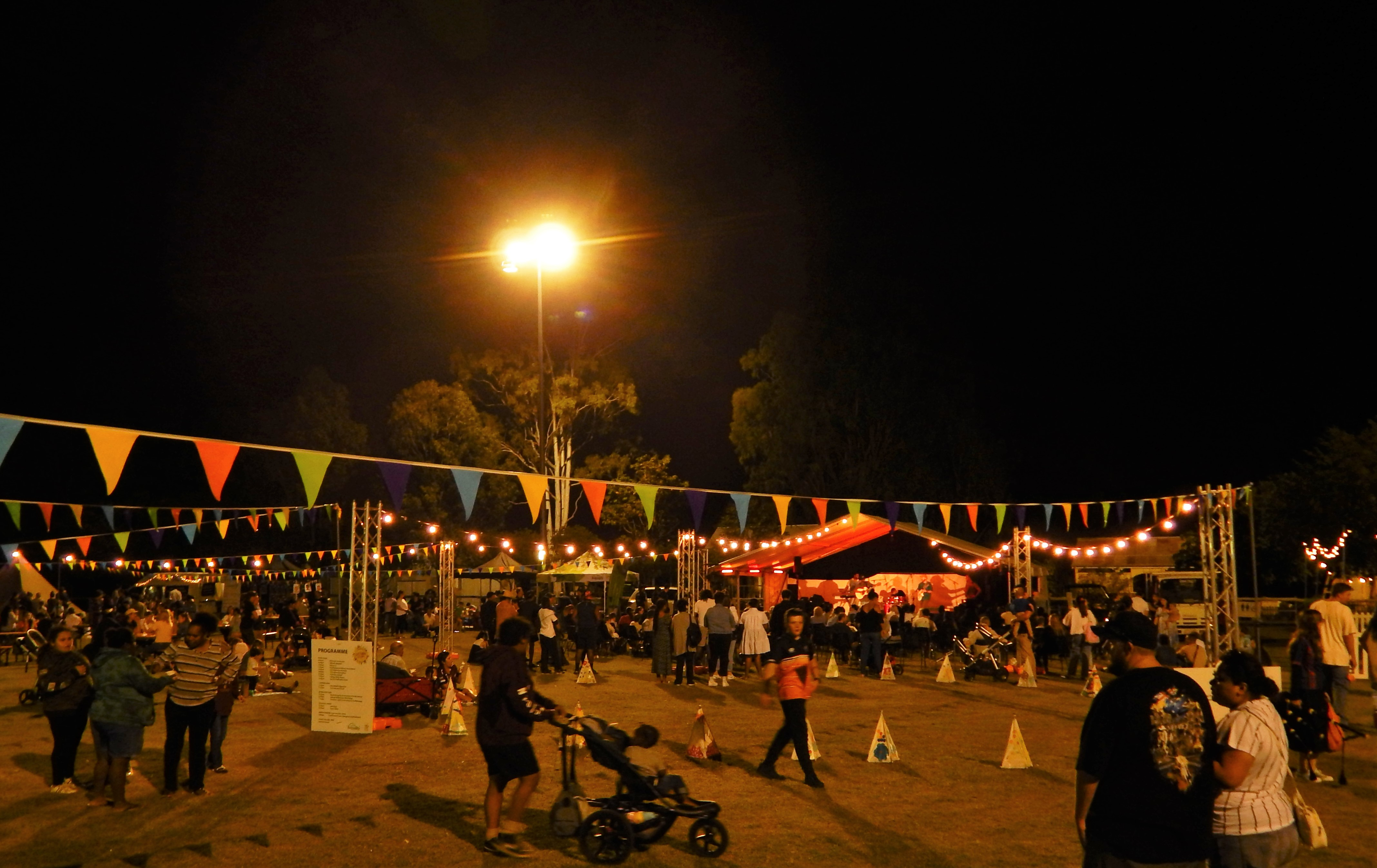
Rockhampton Cultural Festival, 2021

The Rockhampton Heritage Village has also become a regular venue for local events. Prior to the COVID-19 pandemic, market days were held every two months at the attraction. Annual events such as the Rockhampton Cultural Festival, the Rockhampton Emergency Services Day and the Halloween Spooktacular are also held on the site. The venue also hosted the city's annual Carols by Candlelight event in 2012 during the temporary closure of the Rockhampton Music Bowl.

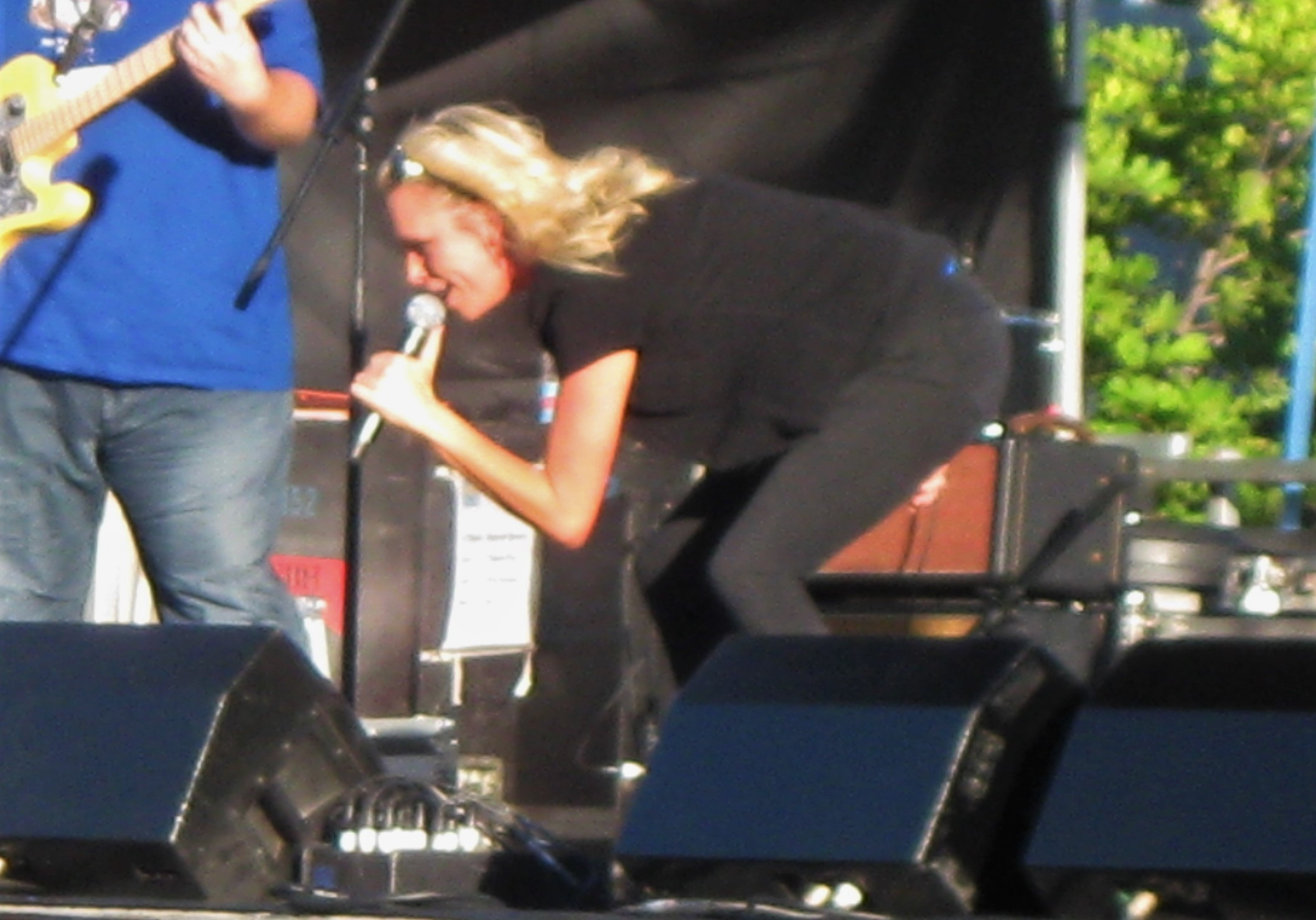
Beccy Cole performing at Rockhampton Heritage Village, 2013

Following the 2013 floods in Central Queensland associated with ex-Tropical Cyclone Oswald, a free concert was held for the local community at the Rockhampton Heritage Village featuring performers such as Ella Hooper and Beccy Cole.

In 2016, the venue was used as a filming location for We Were Tomorrow, an Australian science fiction program starring Gyton Grantley and Johnny Brady.

A new showroom to store and display the Rockhampton Heritage Village's collection of historic vehicles including vintage cars, motorbikes and fire engines was opened in 2017.

The attraction is generally well supported by the local Rockhampton community. However, in 2020 a local media commentator questioned whether the Rockhampton Heritage Village was a financial burden for the council and suggested ways on how to attract more visitors throughout the year to help cover costs. This included proposing the attraction become 100% carbon neutral, recycling its waste, growing organic fruit and vegetables on site, hosting market stalls that only sell environmentally-friendly goods and renewing a working relationship with the nearby Dreamtime Cultural Centre.

After being temporarily closed in 2020 due to the COVID-19 pandemic and the disruptive roadworks associated with the Rockhampton Northern Access Project which saw the Bruce Highway duplicated through Parkhurst, the Rockhampton Heritage Village re-opened in July 2021 with a lowered general admission fee of $5.

Local events soon returned to the venue following its reopening such as the Rockhampton Cultural Festival and the Rockhampton Heritage Village Christmas Fair.

== Buildings ==
Some of the buildings at the Rockhampton Heritage Village include:

Information Centre: Serving as the main entrance to the venue, the tourist information centre also doubles as a gift shop and also houses the Hall of Clocks, an extensive display of vintage clocks dating back to 1630. Originally housed at the Gangalook Museum, the clocks were donated by local watchmaker Ernie Gomersall and his brothers.

The Australian Shearing Shed (replica): Built in the style of a 19th-century shearing shed, the Australian Shearing Shed, situated beside the information centre, is frequently used for formal occasions such as weddings, school formals, industry expos, community forums and other local events.

Wood's Cottage & Barn (original): Built in the early 1900s, the cottage was originated located on a property at Barmoya. In 1978, it was dismantled and moved to the original Gangalook Museum where it was rebuilt. When Gangalook Museum closed, it was relocated again to its current site.

Rosewood Homestead, Kitchen & Shed (original): An original slab homestead which was built in 1888 on a property near Wycarbah. The kitchen is noticeably separate from the homestead to minimise the risk of fire and the keep the house cooler.

Dolls House (original): Originally situated near St Christophers Chapel at Nerimbera, the building was used as a recreation hall by American troops stationed locally during World War II before later being used as a scout hall in Yeppoon. It was relocated to the Rockhampton Heritage Village where it now houses the Myrtle Perkins Doll Collection.

Rackemann's Cottage (original): A small cottage originally situated on a property near Ogmore.

St Peter's Church (original): A de-consecrated Roman Catholic bush church which was originally constructed in 1911 at Westwood before being relocated to Gracemere where it stayed until its closure in 1993.

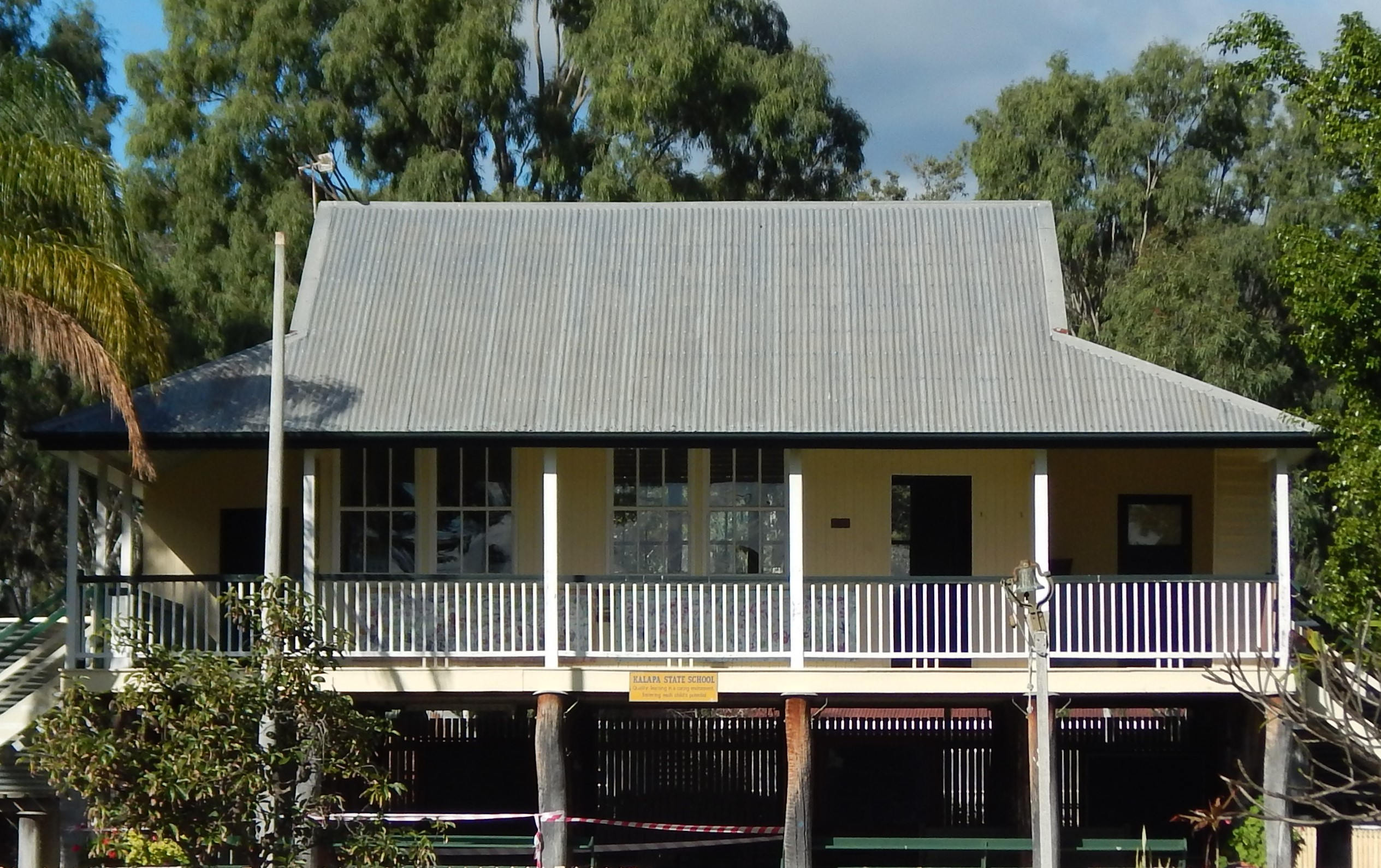
Kalapa State School, 2021

Kalapa State School (original): The original primary school from the rural settlement of Kalapa which was opened in 1915 before being relocated to the Heritage Village upon its closure in 1997.

Country Hospital (original): The original Matron & Nurses' Quarters from Mount Morgan which was built in 1946. The building now houses artefacts and memorabilia associated with over 150 years of health services in Central Queensland which is curated by members and volunteers of the Australian Country Hospital Heritage Association.

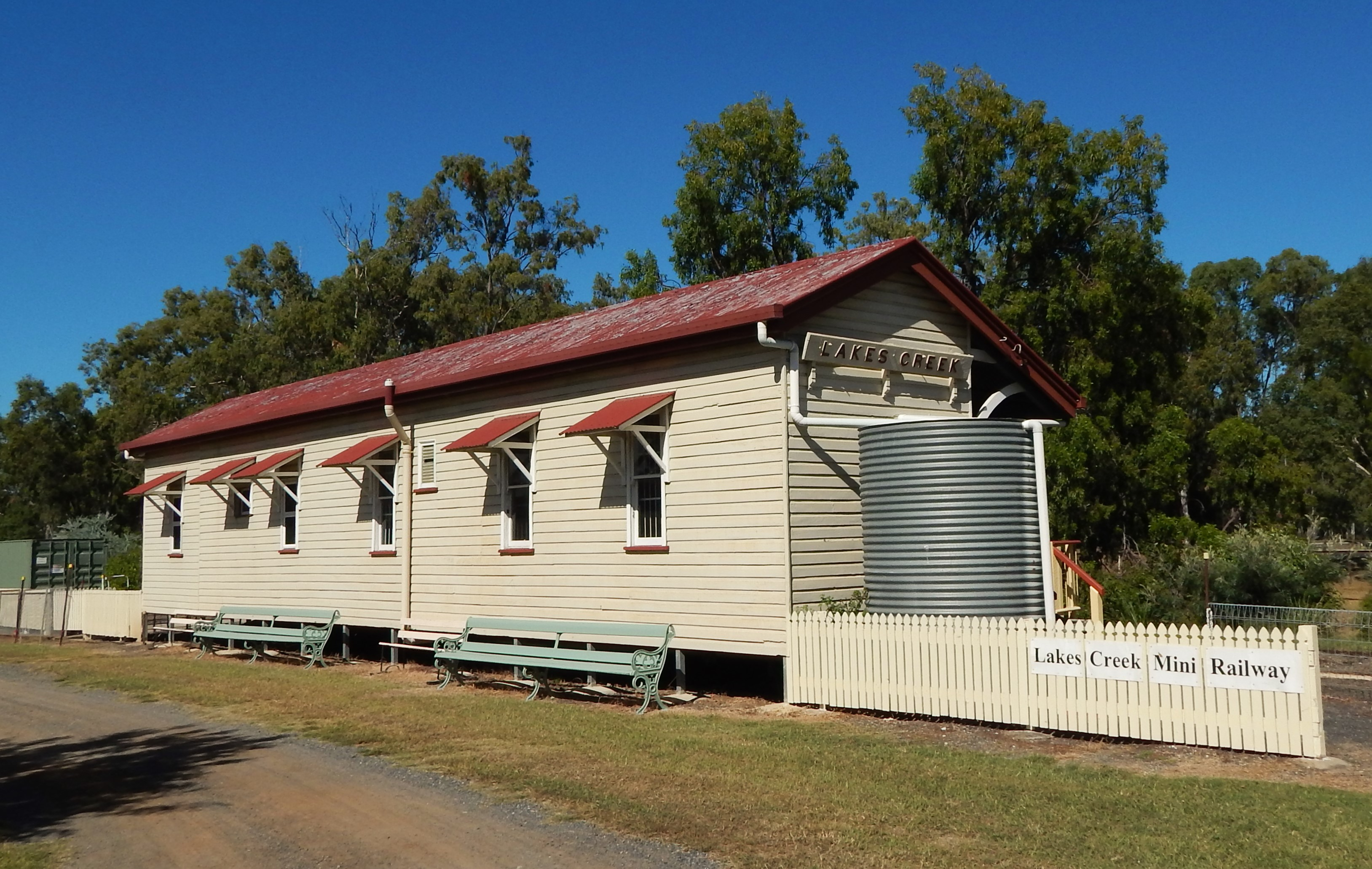
Lakes Creek railway station, 2014

Lakes Creek Railway Station (original): The original railway station which was previously located at Lakes Creek before being relocated to its current site at the Heritage Village. For a brief period, the Rockhampton Heritage Village operated a miniature railway from the station but is not currently in use.

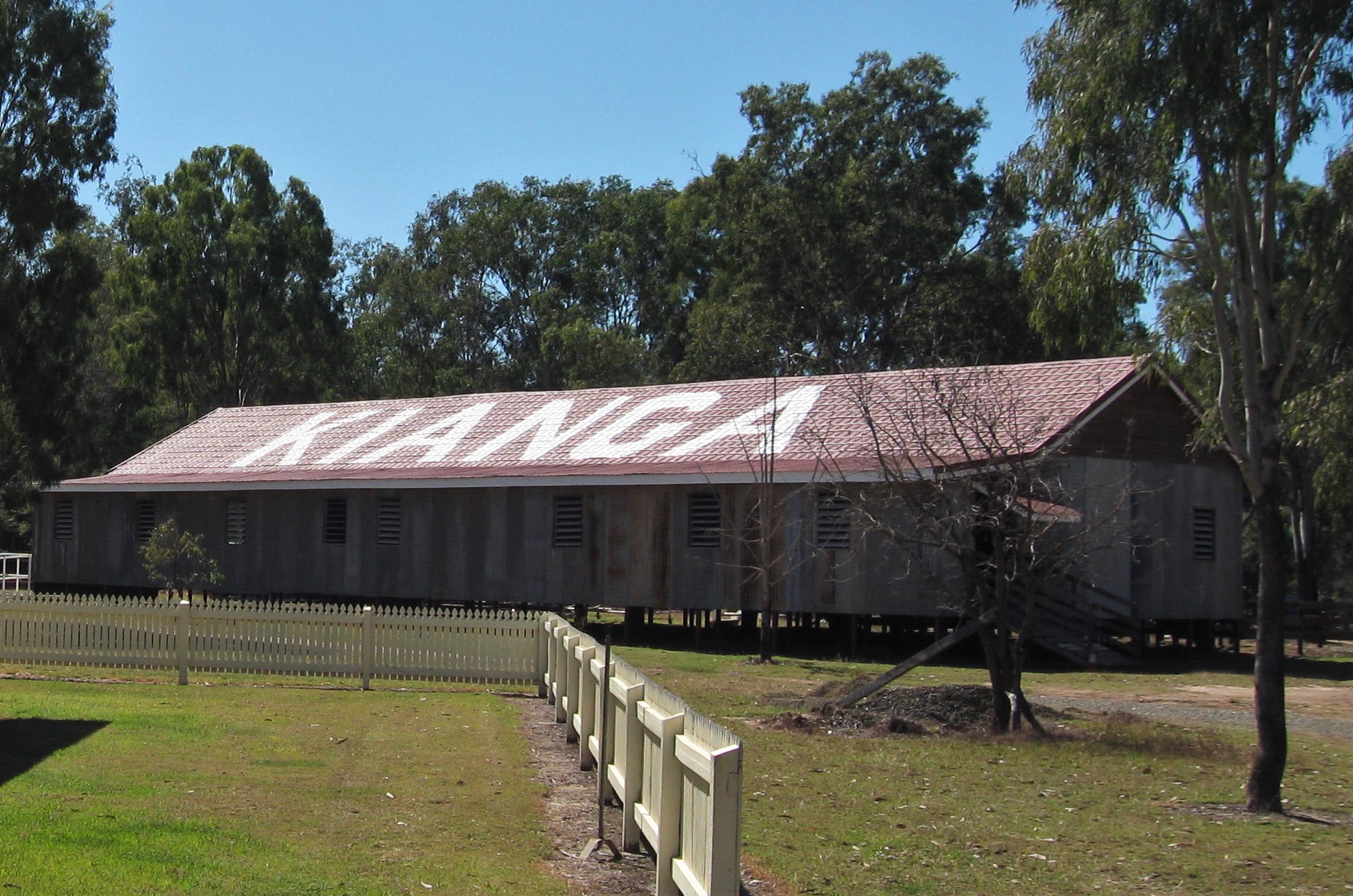
Kianga Shearing Shed, 2012

Kianga Shearing Shed (original): An original steel-framed shearing shed which was relocated to the attraction from Kianga, a property near Moura. It was originally constructed from a kit manufactured by Southern Cross in the 1930s.

Lakes Creek Cottage (original): A cottage originally constructed around 1900 in Mount Morgan but later relocated to Lakes Creek to house local meatworkers.

Dingley Cottage (original): A house originally located in the Rockhampton susburb of The Range and owned by Alice Dingley who lived in the cottage for over 70 years until her death in 2008. The house essentially remained unchanged since its construction as it was never connected to running water or electricity.

Rockhampton Hospital Post Office (original): Originally earmarked for demolition to make way for a new multi-storey carpark at Rockhampton Hospital, the post office which first opened in 1949 was saved and relocated to the Heritage Village in 2017.

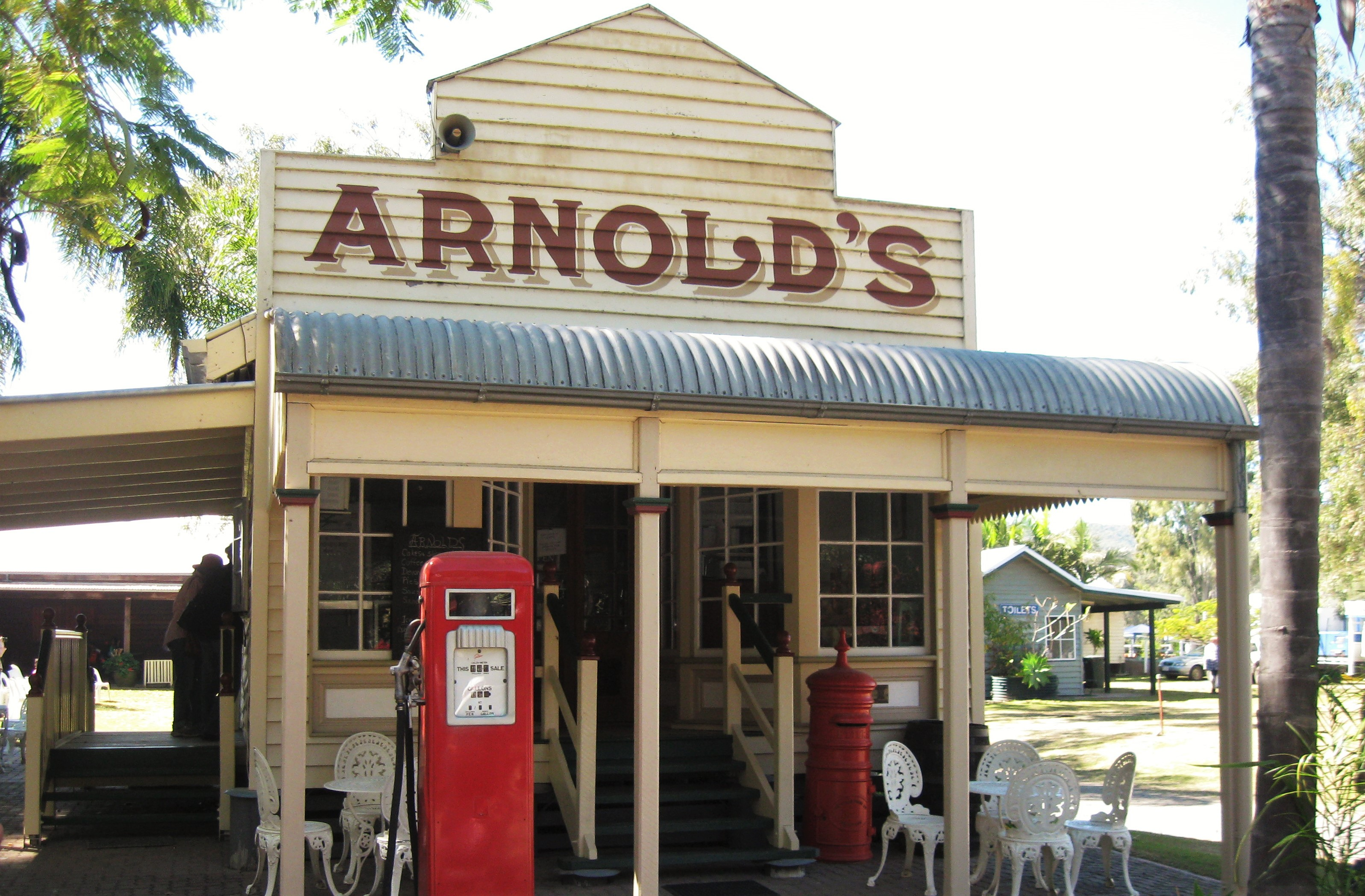
Arnold's Store, 2012

Arnold's Store (replica): A replica of a former Allenstown general store from the 1920s owned by the Arnold sisters.

Karl & Woods Coach and Wagon Works (replica): A replica of a local Rockhampton dray and coach manufacturing business from the late 1800s that once stood on the current site of City Centre Plaza in the city centre.

Neilsen's Buggy Works (replica): A replica of a local Rockhampton buggy and sulky manufacturing business from the late 1880s, once operated by Anders Neilsen.

Charles Street Fire Station (replica): A replica of an existing former fire station building that still stands at 90 Charles Street in Berserker. The replica of the Charles Street Fire Station at the Heritage Village houses the extensive Lex Semple collection of memorabilia detailing the history of the local fire fighting in Central Queensland.

Anderson's City Printing Works (replica): A replica of a local letterpress workshop typical of one used by local firm Anderson's City Printing Works which was established in 1903. The building houses displays of hot metal typesetting machines, presses and historical memorabilia.

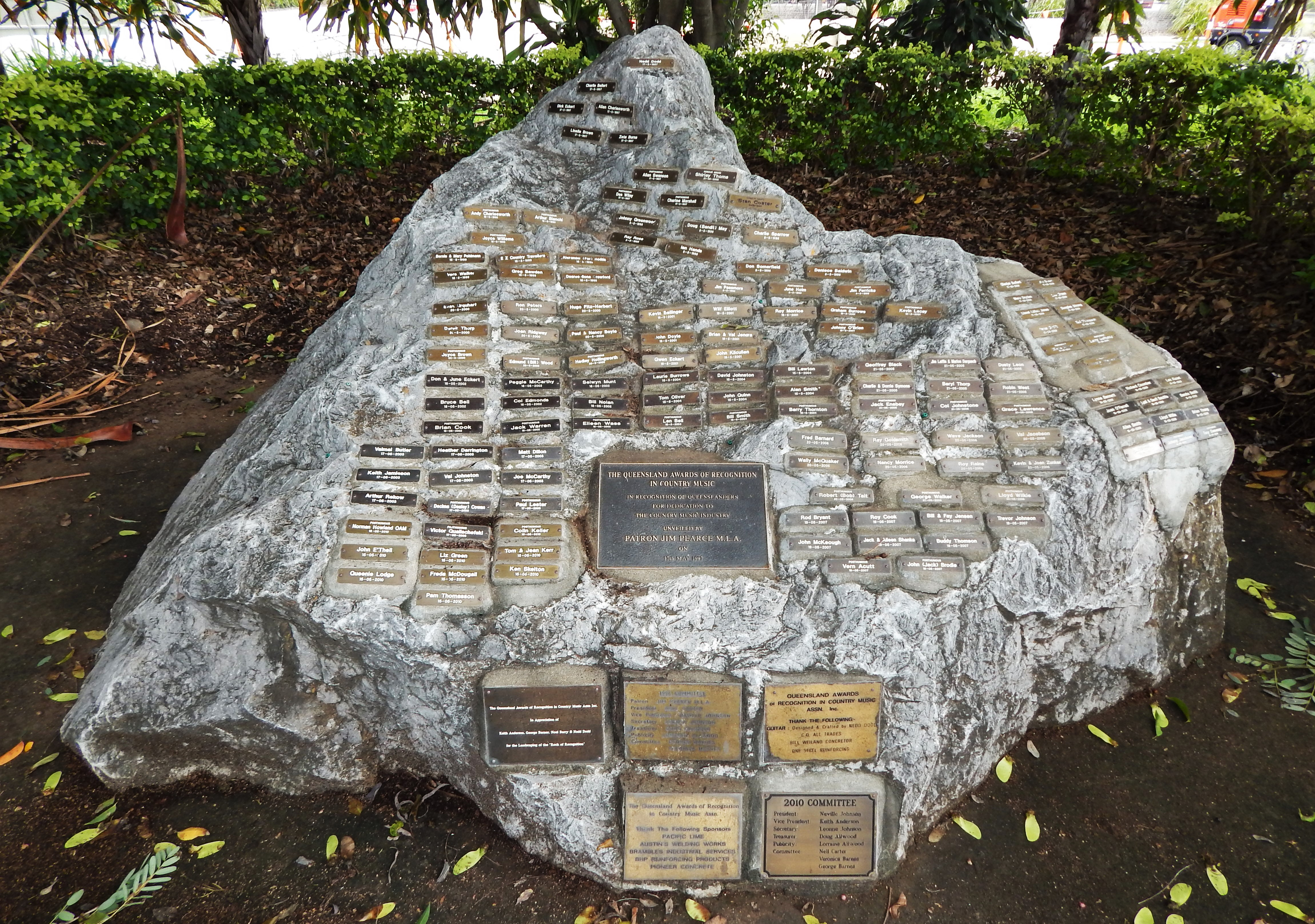
Country Music Rock of Recognition at Rockhampton Heritage Village, 2020

Country Music Rock of Recognition (monument): The Country Music Rock of Recognition is situated in the carpark in front of the Rockhampton Heritage Village. It was unveiled by Jim Pearce on 17 May 1997 in recognition of the dedication of Queenslanders' contribution to the Australian country music industry.

== See also ==
- Dreamtime Cultural Centre
- Archer Park Rail Museum
