= WYIS =

Simulcasts WYSC, McRae
- McRae, Georgia; United States
- Frequency: 1410 kHz
- Branding: Star 102.7

Programming
- Format: Classic hits

Ownership
- Owner: Cinecom Broadcasting Systems, Inc.

History
- First air date: 1957
- Former call signs: WDAX

Technical information
- Licensing authority: FCC
- Facility ID: 71317
- Class: D
- Power: 1,000 watts day
- Transmitter coordinates: 32°3′25.00″N 82°51′56.00″W

Links
- Public license information: Public file; LMS

WYIS (1410 AM) is a radio station broadcasting a classic hits format, simulcasting WYSC 102.7 FM McRae, Georgia. Licensed to McRae, Georgia, USA, the station is owned by Cinecom Broadcasting Systems, Inc.
