= WIEC-LP =

- Eau Claire, Wisconsin; United States
- Frequency: 102.7 MHz

Programming
- Format: Eclectic; diverse
- Affiliations: Pacifica Radio Network

Ownership
- Owner: The Eau Claire Broadcasting Association
- Sister stations: WHYS

History
- Call sign meaning: "Wisconsin Eau Claire"

Technical information
- Licensing authority: FCC
- Facility ID: 132418
- Class: L1
- ERP: 54 watts
- HAAT: −17 m (−56 ft)
- Transmitter coordinates: 44°48′10.00″N 91°29′27.00″W

Links
- Public license information: LMS
- Webcast: Listen Live
- Website: wiecradio.org

WIEC-LP (102.7 FM) is a radio station licensed to Eau Claire, Wisconsin, United States. The station is currently owned by The Eau Claire Broadcasting Association.
