= KDJI =

- Holbrook, Arizona; United States
- Frequency: 1270 kHz
- Branding: Newstalk 1270

Programming
- Format: News Talk Information
- Affiliations: ABC Radio, Premiere Radio Networks

Ownership
- Owner: Petracom of Holbrook, L.L.C.

History
- First air date: 1955

Technical information
- Licensing authority: FCC
- Facility ID: 47887
- Class: D
- Power: 5,000 watts day 130 watts night
- Transmitter coordinates: 34.905833°N 110.190278°W

Links
- Public license information: Public file; LMS
- Webcast: Listen Live
- Website: KDJI website

KDJI (1270 AM) is a radio station broadcasting a talk radio format. Licensed to Holbrook, Arizona, United States, the station is currently owned by Petracom of Holbrook, L.L.C. and features programming from ABC Radio and Premiere Radio Networks.

== History ==
In 2004, the station, along with KVWM, began broadcasting the news/talk format that is still carried on the stations today.
