= KKRO =

- Red Bluff, California; United States
- Broadcast area: Redding; Red Bluff; Corning
- Frequency: 102.7 MHz
- Branding: Air1

Programming
- Format: Christian worship
- Network: Air1

Ownership
- Owner: Educational Media Foundation

History
- First air date: November 1985
- Former call signs: KRBQ (1985–1988); KDJQ (1988–1991); KFXS (1991–1993); KZAP (1993–1995); KEGR (1995–2000); KLVB (2000–2010)

Technical information
- Licensing authority: FCC
- Facility ID: 40829
- Class: C2
- ERP: 5,500 watts
- HAAT: 431 meters (1,414 ft)
- Transmitter coordinates: 40°20′41″N 121°56′48″W

Links
- Public license information: Public file; LMS
- Webcast: Listen live
- Website: air1.com

KKRO (102.7 FM) is a Christian worship formatted radio station licensed to Red Bluff, California, United States, and serves the Redding, California area. The station is currently owned by Educational Media Foundation and airs the nationally syndicated Air1 network.
