= WLMP-LP =

- Fredericksburg, Virginia; United States
- Broadcast area: Metro Fredericksburg
- Frequency: 102.7 MHz
- Branding: The Lamp 102.7

Programming
- Format: Contemporary Christian; Religious

Ownership
- Owner: Calvary Chapel of Fredericksburg

History
- First air date: 2005; 21 years ago
- Call sign meaning: Lamp

Technical information
- Licensing authority: FCC
- Facility ID: 126648
- Class: L1
- ERP: 14 watts
- HAAT: 78.6 meters (258 ft)
- Transmitter coordinates: 38°18′46.0″N 77°26′20.0″W

Links
- Public license information: LMS
- Webcast: Listen live
- Website: listen.streamon.fm/wlmp

WLMP-LP is a Contemporary Christian formatted broadcast radio station licensed to and serving Fredericksburg, Virginia. WLMP-LP is owned and operated by Calvary Chapel of Fredericksburg.

== Translator ==
In addition to the main station, WLMP-LP is relayed by an FM translator to widen its broadcast area.

Call sign	Frequency	City of license	FID	ERP (W)	HAAT	Class	FCC info
W231BJ	94.1 FM	Fredericksburg, Virginia	142770	10	121.5 m (399 ft)	D	LMS
