= WJJC =

- Commerce, Georgia; United States
- Frequency: 1270 kHz
- Branding: Whisperin' 95.1

Programming
- Format: Country music
- Affiliations: Fox News Radio

Ownership
- Owner: Side Communications, Inc.

History
- First air date: 1957

Technical information
- Licensing authority: FCC
- Facility ID: 73141
- Class: D
- Power: 5,000 watts day 173 watts night
- Transmitter coordinates: 34°12′57.00″N 83°26′9.00″W
- Translator: 95.1 W236DU (Commerce)

Links
- Public license information: Public file; LMS
- Website: www.wjjc.net

WJJC (1270 AM) is a radio station broadcasting a country music format and is licensed in Commerce, Georgia, United States. The station, which first began airing in 1957, is owned by Side Communications, Inc. and features programming from Fox News Radio.

Former logo

== Staff ==
The staff includes Rob Jordan, General Manager of WJJC Radio and a native of Jackson County. Since the death of his brother Gerald, the "Voice of the Commerce Tigers" for over 20 years, Rob has taken on the mantle of sportscaster for the Commerce Tiger High School broadcasts.

Craig S. Fischer joined WJJC in July 2005 for the second time, having worked as a DJ while at Commerce High School from 1978 to 1979. He can be heard on various sports broadcasts for Commerce, Jefferson and East Jackson High Schools.

WJJC can now be found at 95.1 FM in the Jackson County area.
