= KBBQ-FM =

Coordinates: 35.448°N 94.365°W

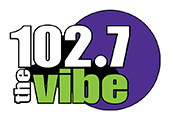
- Van Buren, Arkansas; United States
- Broadcast area: Fort Smith, Arkansas
- Frequency: 102.7 MHz
- Branding: 102.7 The Vibe

Programming
- Format: Top 40 (CHR)
- Affiliations: Compass Media Networks; Westwood One

Ownership
- Owner: Cumulus Media; (Cumulus Licensing LLC)

History
- First air date: December 29, 1982 (as KBCU)
- Former call signs: KBCU (1982–1983); KXXI-FM (1983–1987); KLSZ-FM (1987–2005)

Technical information
- Licensing authority: FCC
- Facility ID: 37827
- Class: C2
- ERP: 17,000 watts
- HAAT: 175 meters

Links
- Public license information: Public file; LMS
- Webcast: Listen live
- Website: 1027thevibe.com

KBBQ-FM (102.7 MHz "102.7 The Vibe") is a commercial top 40 (CHR) radio station located in Van Buren, Arkansas, broadcasting to the Fort Smith, Arkansas, area.
