= Arctic Outpost Radio =

- Longyearbyen; Norway
- Broadcast area: Svalbard
- Frequency: AM 1270
- Branding: Arctic Outpost Radio AM1270

Programming
- Language: English
- Format: Jazz, swing, big band, vintage country, blues

Links
- Webcast: Listen live (via TuneIn)
- Website: www.aor.am

Arctic Outpost Radio is an English-language AM and internet radio station based in Longyearbyen, Svalbard, Norway. The station broadcasts on 1270 AM and also streams online.

According to the station's website, Arctic Outpost Radio plays "great shellacs from 1902-1958" and its programming includes big band, jazz, swing, vintage country, and blues. In 2024, Air Mail described the station as broadcasting on AM for local listeners in Svalbard while also being available digitally worldwide, and identified Cal Lockwood as its host.

In April 2020, during the COVID-19 lockdown in Portugal, the station received sudden attention in Portugal after it was mentioned by broadcaster Nuno Markl during one of comedian Bruno Nogueira's Instagram live broadcasts, Como É Que o Bicho Mexe?. The programme had been launched during Portugal's COVID-19 confinement period and attracted large nightly online audiences. Portuguese news outlets reported that Cal Lockwood's social-media following rose from only a few followers to around 40,000 within hours, mostly from Portugal, and that the sudden increase in listeners caused streaming problems for the station.
