= WYSC =

- McRae, Georgia; United States
- Frequency: 102.7 MHz
- Branding: Star 102.7

Programming
- Format: Classic hits

Ownership
- Owner: Cinecom Broadcasting Systems, Inc.

History
- First air date: 1979 (as WDAX-FM)
- Former call signs: WDAX-FM (1979–1992)

Technical information
- Licensing authority: FCC
- Facility ID: 71318
- Class: A
- ERP: 3,000 watts
- HAAT: 88 meters
- Transmitter coordinates: 32°3′25.00″N 82°51′56.00″W
- Repeater: 1400 WYIS (McRae)

Links
- Public license information: Public file; LMS

WYSC (102.7 FM, "Star 102.7") is a radio station broadcasting a classic hits music format. Licensed to McRae, Georgia, United States, the station is currently owned by Cinecom Broadcasting Systems, Inc.

Along with the affiliated AM station WYIS, the two stations are still incorrectly marked as WDAX-AM by Google Maps.
