= KNDI =

Currently silent
- Honolulu, Hawaii; United States
- Broadcast area: Honolulu, Hawaii; Waianae, Hawaii
- Frequency: 1270 kHz

Ownership
- Owner: Geronimo and Nellie Malabed; (Geronimo Broadcasting, LLC)

History
- First air date: July 7, 1960
- Call sign meaning: Candy

Technical information
- Licensing authority: FCC
- Facility ID: 37065
- Class: B
- Power: 5,000 watts
- Transmitter coordinates: 21°19′14.7″N 157°52′37″W

Links
- Public license information: Public file; LMS
- Website: www.kndi.com

KNDI (1270 AM) is a radio station licensed to Honolulu, Hawaii, United States, that is currently silent. The station is owned by Geronimo and Nellie Malabed, through licensee Geronimo Broadcasting, LLC, and last aired a multicultural format. Its on-air liners are "Voices from Around the World" and has been on the air since 1960. It was the first radio station in Hawaii to have an all-female airstaff, hence the KNDI call sign, which phonetically spells out "Candy." KNDI features programming in Philippine languages (Ilocano and Tagalog), Chinese (Cantonese and Mandarin), Okinawan, Vietnamese, Lao, Spanish, Samoan, Tongan, Marshallese, Chuukese, Pohnpeian and English.

In 2025, the station began simulcasting on K284AL (104.7 FM).

The station continued to broadcast on AM 1270 until March 10, 2026, when they had to vacate AM their transmitter tower, effective immediately. The order came from the Department of Hawaiian Home Lands, who owns the property the tower stands on. They cited undefined "safety concerns" as their reason. The station opened a GoFundMe campaign to raise money for a return to their AM frequency, with a stated goal of US $18,000.

== Gallery ==
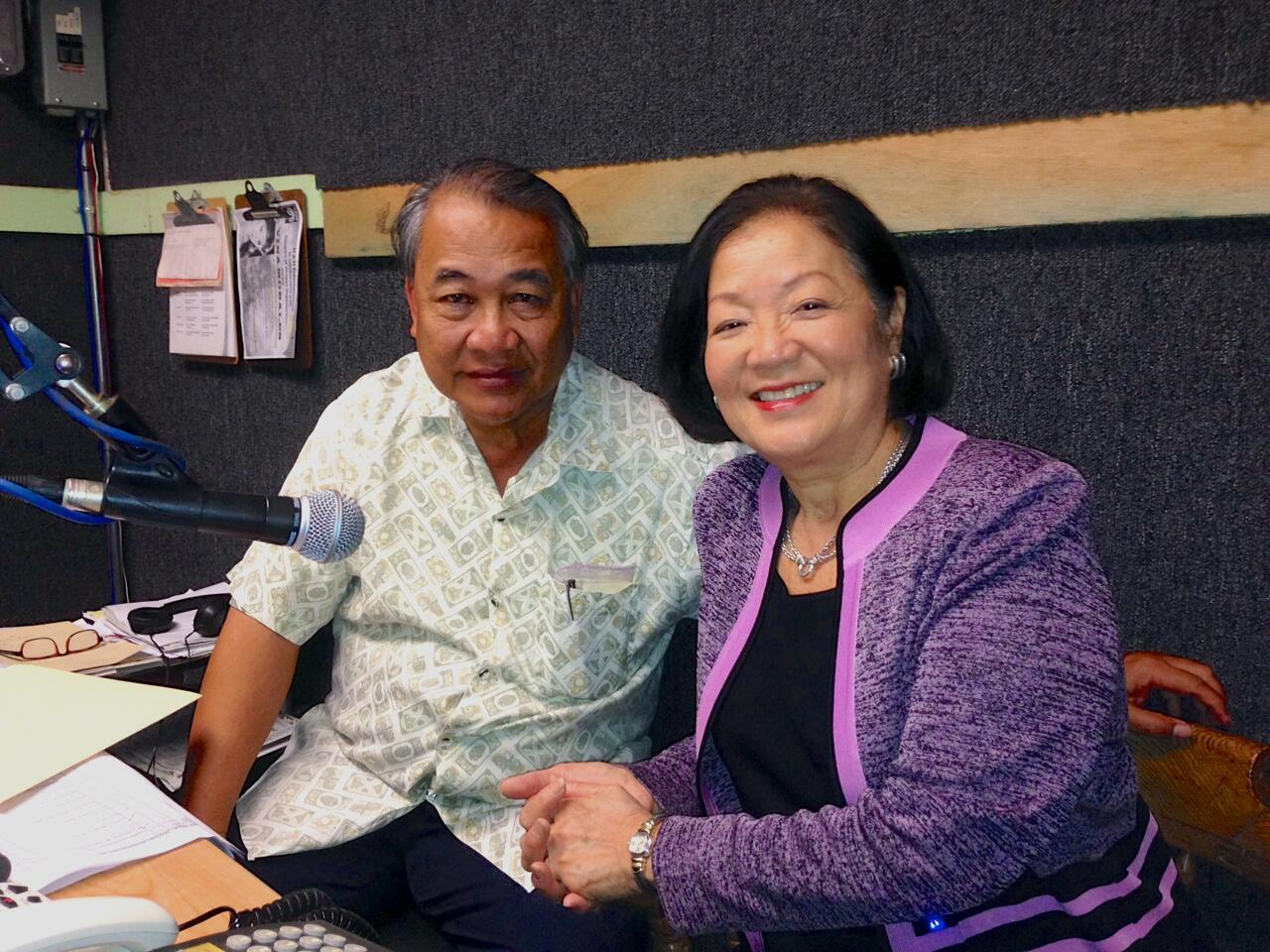
KNDI host Flor Martinez in studio with Senator Mazie Hirono in 2014.
