= Townsville Aboriginal and Torres Strait Islander Cultural Centre =

Indigenous community cultural center in Townsville, Queensland, Australia

The Townsville Aboriginal and Torres Strait Islander Cultural Centre (TATSICC) is a cultural exhibit venue for the Indigenous community in North Queensland, located in the Reef HQ Complex in Townsville's City Centre. It showcases Aboriginal and Torres Strait Islander history, culture, traditions and heritage to the local, national and international markets. The centre hosts performance and visual arts events, presenting daily performances of dance, music, story telling and presenting insights into the indigenous people of the North Queensland region. The centre also provides small business training to Indigenous artists.

TATSICC hosts an Interpretive Gallery which houses a selection of historic and contemporary artefacts and information collected from North Queensland. Also included are commercial fine arts gallery exhibits including a selection of works by Indigenous artists of regional and national acclaim. A primary aim of the centre is to provide facilities for Indigenous performance/dance groups to practice and display their craft. Guided tours of the Gallery and art exhibits are provided for group tours and there are two public dance performances each day.

The Centre has five full-time staff and offers 12 one-year traineeships for unemployed Indigenous people with grant funds of $400,000 from the State and Federal Government. It includes performance space, an artisans' gallery and work area, a cafe, retail space, courtyard, green room for VIPs, and a steel sculpture collection of indigenous silhouettes.

== History ==
It was officially launched in July 2005 at an indigenous expo attended by 500 people where Elders performed a traditional Aboriginal smoking ceremony to clear the area of evil spirits and a traditional song of prayer was given by Torres Strait Islander elders to protect visitors to the centre. The Centre then opened for business in August of that year.

Originally envisaged as a place of meeting for indigenous people to mix and teach their culture both to the younger generations and to other interested people. Planning and lobbying for the Cultural Centre had been ongoing since the 1960s. Since then at least five schemes were proposed until settling on the Reef HQ complex site in 2003 where the Cultural Centre finally found a home. Before the centre was established it was difficult to rent venues for demonstration events of Aboriginal cultural or meetings and planning sessions for the Cultural Centre. Previously the Dean Park Soundshell was canvassed as a potential site for TATSICC which would also have provide open spaces for cultural activities, however this option was vetoed by the City Council.

In October 1999, the Federal Government announced a Centenary of Federation grant of $3 million for a "North Queensland Aboriginal and Torres Strait Islander Cultural Centre". The now defunct Aboriginal and Torres Strait Islander Commission contributed $2 million. and the then Townsville Regional Council of ATSIC furthered the cause by contributing $80,000 for a strategic plan.

Once commissioned the project was spearheaded by Aboriginal and Torres Strait Islander Elders Advisory Committee of Townsville City Council from October 1999 to July 2001, planning was then taken over by a Queensland Heritage Trails Network Cultural Centre Steering Committee. The Centre cost a total of about $6 million.
