= WRJC-FM =

- Mauston, Wisconsin; United States
- Broadcast area: Wisconsin Dells
- Frequency: 92.1 MHz
- Branding: Now 92One FM

Programming
- Format: Hot adult contemporary

Ownership
- Owner: Murphy's Law Media Group, LLC
- Sister stations: WRJC (AM)

History
- First air date: 1976

Technical information
- Licensing authority: FCC
- Facility ID: 73958
- Class: A
- ERP: 2,000 watts
- HAAT: 174.0 meters (570.9 ft)
- Transmitter coordinates: 43°47′16.00″N 90°11′52.00″W

Links
- Public license information: Public file; LMS
- Webcast: Listen Live
- Website: WRJC-FM website

WRJC-FM (92.1 MHz, "NOW 92ONE FM") is a radio station broadcasting a hot adult contemporary format. Licensed to Mauston, Wisconsin, United States, the station serves the Wisconsin Dells area. The station is currently owned by Murphy's Law Media Group, LLC.
