= WOKH =

- Springfield, Kentucky; United States
- Frequency: 102.7 MHz
- Branding: 102.7 The Rocket

Programming
- Format: Adult contemporary

Ownership
- Owner: Managing Partner, Roth Stratton; (Bardstown Radio Team, LLC)
- Sister stations: WBRT

History
- First air date: February 17, 1989 9as WMQQ)
- Former call signs: WMQQ (1989–1996); WAKY-FM (1996–2006); WYSB (2006–2014)
- Call sign meaning: Old Kentucky Home (based on popular song)

Technical information
- Licensing authority: FCC
- Facility ID: 71010
- Class: A
- ERP: 4,000 watts
- HAAT: 108 meters (355 feet)
- Transmitter coordinates: 37°41′43″N 85°19′6″W

Links
- Public license information: Public file; LMS
- Webcast: Listen Live
- Website: wokh.fm

WOKH (102.7 FM) is an adult contemporary–formatted radio station licensed to serve Springfield, Kentucky, as well as Lebanon and Bardstown. The station is owned by Bardstown Radio Team, LLC as part of a duopoly with Bardstown–licensed country music station WBRT (1320 AM). The two stations share studios on South Third Street in downtown Bardstown, while its transmitter facilities are located off Lanham Road in rural Washington County west of Springfield.

== History ==
Choice Radio sold WOKH to current ownership Bardstown Radio Team, owner of WBRT, in 2017.

The station has been assigned these call letters by the Federal Communications Commission since January 12, 2006.
