= KYGT-LP =

- Idaho Springs, Colorado; United States
- Frequency: 102.7 MHz
- Branding: The Goat

Programming
- Format: Variety

Ownership
- Owner: Clear Creek Radio, Inc.

History
- Former call signs: KRIK-LP (2002–2002)

Technical information
- Licensing authority: FCC
- Facility ID: 131469
- Class: L1
- ERP: 100 watts
- HAAT: 19.0 meters (62.3 ft)
- Transmitter coordinates: 39°43′56″N 105°40′38″W
- Translator: 103.9 K280FZ (Black Hawk)

Links
- Public license information: LMS
- Website: clearcreekradio.com

KYGT-LP (102.7 FM, "The Goat") is a low-power radio station broadcasting a variety format. Licensed to Idaho Springs, Colorado, United States, the station is currently owned by Clear Creek Radio, Inc.

== History ==
The station was assigned the call sign KRIK-LP on 2002-02-05. On 2002-11-05, the station changed its call sign to the current KYGT-LP.
