= KSCB-FM =

Radio station in Liberal, Kansas

- Liberal, Kansas; United States
- Frequency: 107.5 MHz
- Branding: B 107.5

Programming
- Format: Hot adult contemporary

Ownership
- Owner: Seward County Broadcasting Co., Inc.

History
- First air date: July 10, 1978

Technical information
- Licensing authority: FCC
- Facility ID: 59801
- Class: C1
- ERP: 100,000 watts
- HAAT: 142 meters (466 ft)
- Transmitter coordinates: 37°02′45″N 101°06′07″W

Links
- Public license information: Public file; LMS
- Webcast: Listen live
- Website: 1075.kscb.net

KSCB-FM is a radio station airing a hot adult contemporary format licensed to Liberal, Kansas, broadcasting on 107.5 FM. The station is owned by Seward County Broadcasting Co., Inc.
