= WHGS (AM) =

- Hampton, South Carolina; United States
- Frequency: 1270 kHz

Programming
- Format: Silent

Ownership
- Owner: Bocock Communications, LLC
- Sister stations: WBHC-FM

History
- First air date: 1957
- Former call signs: WBHC (1957–2000)

Technical information
- Licensing authority: FCC
- Facility ID: 25916
- Class: B
- Power: 10,000 watts day 219 watts night
- Transmitter coordinates: 32°50′38″N 81°7′32″W
- Translator: (96.1 MHz) W241DA (Hampton)

Links
- Public license information: Public file; LMS

WHGS (1270 AM) is a silent radio station licensed to Hampton, South Carolina, United States. The station is owned by Bocock Communications, LLC.
