= WRJC (AM) =

- Mauston, Wisconsin; United States
- Frequency: 1270 kHz
- Branding: Smash Country

Programming
- Format: Country

Ownership
- Owner: Murphy's Law Media Group, LLC
- Sister stations: WRJC-FM

Technical information
- Licensing authority: FCC
- Facility ID: 73957
- Class: D
- Power: 500 watts day 27 watts night
- Transmitter coordinates: 43°49′52.00″N 90°4′51.00″W
- Repeater: 92.9 W225BF (Mauston)

Links
- Public license information: Public file; LMS
- Webcast: Listen Live
- Website: wrjc.com

WRJC (1270 kHz, "Smash Country") is an AM radio station broadcasting a country music format. Licensed to Mauston, Wisconsin, United States, the station is currently owned by Murphy's Law Media Group, LLC. WRJC-AM features Mauston Golden Eagles Athletics including: Football, Volleyball, Boys & Girls Basketball, Baseball & Softball The station also carries Milwaukee Brewers baseball.

== History ==
The station first signed on the air in 1964 under the call letters WRJC, under the leadership of Richard C. Bakalars. The station was licensed as a "daytimer" on 1270 kHz, meaning it was required to cease broadcasting at sunset to prevent interference with other stations on the same frequency. In its early decades, WRJC focused on "Full Service" programming, including local agriculture reports, high school sports, and local news tailored to the Mauston and New Lisbon areas.

In 1969, an FM sister station was launched as WRJC-FM (92.1), which expanded the station's broadcast reach beyond the immediate Mauston area.
