= 102.7FM (Toowoomba) =

Coordinates: 27.5586°S 151.9534°E

102.7FM (ACMA callsign: 4DDB) is a community radio station operating in Toowoomba, Queensland. Established in the 1970s, it broadcasts from studios in the city's CBD, and is transmitted from Mount Kynoch in Toowoomba. It is a member of the Community Broadcasting Association of Australia.

== Audience ==
102.7FM's signal propagates throughout Toowoomba, the Darling Downs and Lockyer Valley and listeners report acceptable signals from as far away as North Brisbane, the Lockyer Valley, Dalby, over the NSW border and to the South Burnett.

== Programming ==
As a "generalist" style community broadcaster, 102.7FM seeks simply to connect with its audience within the geographic coverage provided by its transmitter. 102.7FM caters for special- interest groups by programming with dedicated, Dutch, Filipino, and Christian, multi-faith programs which air on a weekly basis. Likewise, print-handicapped members of the community benefit from daily news, events, articles, current affairs and weather readings sourced from local and state, national and international print media. 102.7FM supports a high Australian content policy in its programming and encourages local artists and performers to contribute works for broadcast.

102.7FM broadcasts programs of many musical genres including country, pop, rock, jazz, oldtime and folk, urban, alternative as well as informational content and community announcements. 102.7FM follows a traditional radio broadcasting format including early morning, breakfast, news, lunchtime, 'drive', evening and 'graveyard' slots or shifts.

== Funding ==
4DDB is supported financially through subscriptions, sponsorship, donations and grant funding.

== Licence breaches ==
In May 2008, the Australian Communications and Media Authority found that 4DDB was in breach of its licence conditions by failing to appropriately disclose financial support during live interviews with commercial sponsors. No penalty was issued as this was the first such breach.

In September 2008, the Australian Communications and Media Authority, investigating in response to two written complaints, again found that 4DDB was operating in breach of its licence conditions specified by Schedule 2 to the Broadcasting Services Act 1992 by i) broadcasting advertisements without acknowledgement of financial support, ii) exceeding the five minutes per hour limit of sponsorship announcements, and iii) operating the service as part of a profit- making enterprise. ACMA did find however, that the service was adequately representing the community interest. The investigation detailed the complex programming, commercial and financial arrangements and agreements that have been in place between the management committee, presenters and other parties. It also mentions verbal agreements and found that, in practice, 4DDB had effectively sold air time to other parties. The investigation concluded that these breaches of licence conditions were of a serious nature and as such ACMA would pursue compliance measures.

== See also ==
- List of radio stations in Australia
