= KRXO (AM) =

Commercial radio station

Coordinates: 36°15′55″N 95°42′37″W

- Claremore, Oklahoma; United States
- Broadcast area: Tulsa metropolitan area
- Frequency: 1270 kHz
- Branding: Ritmo 107.9

Programming
- Language: Spanish
- Format: Contemporary hit radio–Latin pop–reggaeton–tropical music

Ownership
- Owner: Tyler Media Group; (Tyler Media LLC)

History
- First air date: January 17, 1958
- Former call signs: KWPR (1958–1983); KOKN (1983–1985); KWPR (1985–1990); KTRT (1990–2000); KRVT (2000–2014); KTUZ (2014–2015)

Technical information
- Licensing authority: FCC
- Facility ID: 50215
- Class: B
- Power: 5,000 watts daytime; 1,000 watts nighttime
- Translator: See § Translators

Links
- Public license information: Public file; LMS
- Webcast: Listen live
- Website: thefranchiseok.com

KRXO (1270 kHz) is an AM radio station licensed to Claremore, Oklahoma, United States, serving the Tulsa metropolitan area. KRXO is owned by Tyler Media Group. It was previously simulcast from co-owned KRXO-FM in Oklahoma City, with NBC Sports Radio programming on late nights and weekends. KRXO programs are also broadcast on FM translator stations K300CY at 107.9 MHz and K245BZ at 96.9 MHz

KRXO transmits with a directional signal at 5,000 watts in the daytime and 1,000 watts at night. The day signal is maximized to send a 13,000 watt ERP lobe up and down Interstate 44.

== History ==
The station originated as KWPR on January 17, 1958. The call sign was a tribute to famous Oklahoman Will Rogers. It began as a 500-watt daytimer, required to sign off at night to avoid interfering with other stations on AM 1270. In 1959, the station was acquired by BRT Broadcasting.

On September 16, 2015, the then-KTUZ dropped its Spanish language format and picked up the sports talk format from sister station KRXO-FM in Oklahoma City. The station changed its call sign to KRXO on October 5, 2015.

On June 15, 2020, KRXO dropped its simulcast with KRXO-FM and changed its format from sports to Spanish CHR, branded as "Ritmo 107.9".

== Translators ==
Call sign	Frequency	City of license	FID	ERP (W)	HAAT	Class	FCC info
K227DT	93.3 FM	Tulsa, Oklahoma	203072	1 vertical	6 m (20 ft)	D	LMS
K245BZ	96.9 FM	Tulsa, Oklahoma	158270	2 horizontal	12 m (39 ft)	D	LMS
K300CY	107.9 FM	Tulsa, Oklahoma	157502	250	167 m (548 ft)	D	LMS

== Previous logo ==
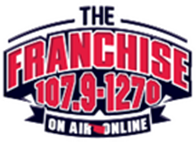
