= KLDG =

- Liberal, Kansas; United States
- Frequency: 102.7 MHz
- Branding: The Legend

Programming
- Format: Country music

Ownership
- Owner: Seward County Broadcasting Co., Inc.

Technical information
- Licensing authority: FCC
- Facility ID: 59802
- Class: C1
- ERP: 100,000 watts
- HAAT: 142 meters (466 ft)
- Transmitter coordinates: 37°02′45″N 101°06′07″W

Links
- Public license information: Public file; LMS
- Website: 1027.kscb.net

KLDG is a radio station airing a country music format licensed to Liberal, Kansas, broadcasting on 102.7 FM. The station is owned by Seward County Broadcasting Co., Inc.
