= KIEV-LP =

Coordinates: 45°39′22″N 122°23′08″W

- Camas, Washington; United States
- Broadcast area: Portland Metro Area
- Frequency: 102.7 FM

Programming
- Language: English
- Format: Classic country

Ownership
- Owner: Outlaw Music Association

History
- Former call signs: KCVD-LP (2014–2015)
- Former frequencies: 102.5 MHz (2014–2016, 2017-2018)
- Call sign meaning: Kiev is the capital and largest city of Ukraine

Technical information
- Licensing authority: FCC
- Facility ID: 196496
- ERP: 100 Watts

Links
- Public license information: LMS
- Website: www.outlaw.fm

KIEV-LP, a low-power radio station licensed to serve Camas, Washington, United States. It formerly held the call sign KCVD-LP from 2014 to 2015. The station is owned by Outlaw Music Association.

KIEV-LP plays primarily classic country music, and is called "Outlaw Country Radio", "1025 The Outlaw" or "Outlaw FM."
