= WUFR-LP =

- Umatilla, Florida; United States
- Frequency: 102.7 MHz
- Branding: Pure Country Umatilla

Programming
- Format: Classic country

Ownership
- Owner: Communication Arts Center

Technical information
- Licensing authority: FCC
- Facility ID: 134390
- Class: L1
- ERP: 80 watts
- HAAT: 33.4 meters (110 ft)
- Transmitter coordinates: 28°55′36.95″N 81°40′11.27″W

Links
- Public license information: LMS
- Website: purecountryumatilla.com

WUFR-LP (102.7 FM) is a radio station licensed to Umatilla, Florida, United States. The station is currently owned by Communication Arts Center.
