= KSCB (AM) =

Radio station in Liberal, Kansas

- Liberal, Kansas; United States
- Broadcast area: Southwest Kansas
- Frequency: 1270 kHz
- Branding: Talkradio 1270am

Programming
- Format: News Talk Information
- Affiliations: Premiere Radio Networks, USA Radio Network

Ownership
- Owner: Seward County Broadcasting Co., Inc.

Technical information
- Licensing authority: FCC
- Facility ID: 59803
- Class: D
- Power: 5,000 watts day 25 watts night
- Transmitter coordinates: 37°3′34.00″N 100°54′5.00″W
- Translator: (103.1 MHz) K222DM (Liberal)

Links
- Public license information: Public file; LMS
- Webcast: Listen live
- Website: kscbnews.net

KSCB (1270 AM, "Talkradio 1270am") is a radio station broadcasting a news/talk/information format. Licensed to Liberal, Kansas, United States, the station serves the Southwest Kansas area. The station is currently owned by Seward County Broadcasting Co., Inc. and features programming from Premiere Radio Networks and USA Radio Network.

== History ==
KSCB began broadcasting July 25, 1948, on 1270 kHz with 1 KW power (daytime only). It was licensed to Seward County Broadcasting Company, which was owned by former Kansas Governor Alf Landon and others.
