= Opus Media Partners =

Radio company with stations in multiple cities

Opus Media Partners, L.L.C. was a Limited liability company that ran radio stations. The company was operated individually out of three cities, Alexandria, Louisiana, Monroe, Louisiana, and Tallahassee, Florida. Each of the three radio station blocks ran as individual companies under the same name. Opus exited the business on January 6, 2014, when it sold its Louisiana properties to Mapleton Communications. The Tallahassee properties were sold off in November 2013 to newcomer Red Hills Broadcasting.

== Former properties ==
- Opus Broadcasting Tallahassee, LLC
  - WWOF
  - WANK
  - WHTF
  - WQTL
- Opus Broadcasting Monroe, LLC
  - KXRR
  - KQLQ
  - KZRZ
  - KMYY
- Opus Broadcasting Alexandria, LLC
  - KLAA
  - KEZP
  - KBKK
  - KEDG
