= KTFR =

Radio station in Chelsea, Oklahoma

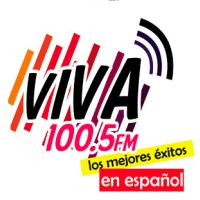
- Chelsea, Oklahoma; United States
- Broadcast area: Tulsa metropolitan area
- Frequency: 100.5 MHz
- Branding: Viva 100.5

Programming
- Language: Spanish
- Format: Spanish variety

Ownership
- Owner: Key Plus Broadcasting, LLC
- Sister stations: KCXR; KEMX; KXTD

History
- First air date: March 1, 2001
- Former frequencies: 100.7 MHz (2001–201?)

Technical information
- Licensing authority: FCC
- Facility ID: 41636
- Class: C3
- ERP: 25,000 watts
- HAAT: 91.9 meters (302 ft)
- Transmitter coordinates: 36°27′33″N 95°29′56″W

Links
- Public license information: Public file; LMS
- Website: laradioviva.com

KTFR (100.5 FM) is a radio station licensed to Chelsea, Oklahoma, United States, serving the Tulsa metropolitan area, broadcasting a Spanish variety format. Owned by Key Plus Broadcasting, LLC, the station maintains studios (alongside KXTD) on East 31st Street, near South Garnett Road in Tulsa, with its transmitter located on U.S. Route 66 near Chelsea.

== History ==
This station was assigned call sign KTFR on April 9, 1992, and originally licensed to Claremore, Oklahoma. The station officially launched on March 1, 2001, and its city of license moved to Chelsea. The station began as a simulcast for Contemporary Christian station KXOJ-FM in Sapulpa.

On April 25, 2013, Stephens Media Group sold KTFR (along with KCXR and KEMX) to Roger Chasteen's ABS Communications, Inc. for $500,000. The sale would allow Stephens to acquire KMYZ-FM and KTSO. The sale was completed in June and KTFR dropped its KXOJ simulcast.

On June 15, 2015, it was announced that ABS Communications would sell KTFR, KCXR, and KEMX to Key Plus Broadcasting, LLC for $800,000. The sale was completed on August 19.
