= Thunder Radio Network =

Broadcasts Oklahoma City Thunder basketball games

The Thunder Radio Network provides radio play-by-play and coverage of Oklahoma City Thunder games to stations mostly located in the state of Oklahoma. The primary station is WWLS-FM 98.1 "The Sports Animal" in Oklahoma City; many of the affiliate stations also carry other WWLS programs.

Matt Pinto is the play-by-play announcer on the radio.

== Affiliates ==
Callsign	Frequency	Location
WWLS-FM	98.1 FM	Oklahoma City
KWPN	640 AM	Oklahoma City
KHIM	97.7 FM	Altus/Hobart
KVSO	1240 AM	Ardmore
K298CR	107.5 FM	Ardmore
KKBI	106.1 FM	Broken Bow/Idabel
KADS	1240 AM	Elk City
K251CN	98.1 FM	Elk City
KCRC	1390 AM	Enid
KKRX	1380 AM	Lawton
KMCO	101.3 FM	McAlester
KYAL-AM-FM	1550 AM/97.1 FM	Tulsa/Sapulpa/Muskogee
K260CR	99.9 FM	Tulsa/Sapulpa/Muskogee
KITO-FM	96.1 FM	Vinita
KSIW	1450 AM	Woodward
K251CM	98.1 FM	Woodward

=== Outside of Oklahoma ===
==== Kansas ====
Callsign	Frequency	Location
KEOJ	101.1 FM	Caney/Bartlesville

=== Spanish-language ===
One station provides coverage of Thunder home games in Spanish: WKY 930 in Oklahoma City. The Thunder broadcasts in Spanish feature play-by-play announcer Eleno Ornelas, also the Spanish-language voice of the Texas Rangers.
