= KCXR =

Radio station in Taft, Oklahoma

Simulcast of KXTD, Wagoner
- Taft, Oklahoma; United States
- Frequency: 100.3 MHz
- Branding: Que Buena

Programming
- Format: Regional Mexican

Ownership
- Owner: Key Plus Broadcasting, LLC
- Sister stations: KEMX; KTFR; KXTD

History
- First air date: March 20, 1990 (as KHSA)
- Former call signs: KHSA (CP, 1989–1990); KHJM (1990–2003)

Technical information
- Licensing authority: FCC
- Facility ID: 64514
- Class: A
- ERP: 4,000 watts
- HAAT: 125 meters (410 ft)
- Transmitter coordinates: 35°48′42″N 95°34′12″W

Links
- Public license information: Public file; LMS
- Webcast: Listen live
- Website: www.quebuenatulsa.com

KCXR (100.3 FM) is a radio station in Taft, Oklahoma, United States. Owned by Key Plus Broadcasting, LLC, the station simulcasts a Regional Mexican radio format with KXTD (1530 AM) in Wagoner.

== History ==
The station signed on the air as KHSA on March 20, 1990.

On October 21, 2002, Taft Broadcasting, Inc. (not to confused with the company of the same name) announced it would sell KHJM and KBIX to KXOJ, Inc. (later named Stephen Media Group) for $1 million. The sale was completed on December 11.

On April 25, 2013, Stephens Media Group sold KCXR (along with KEMX and KTFR) to Roger Chasteen's ABS Communications, Inc. for $500,000. The sale would allow Stephens to acquire KMYZ-FM and KTSO. The sale was completed in June.

On June 15, 2015, it was announced that ABS Communications would sell KCXR, KEMX, and KTFR to Key Plus Broadcasting, LLC for $800,000. The sale was completed on August 19.

On August 24, 2015, KCXR changed their format from Christian rock to regional Mexican, simulcasting KXTD 1530 AM.
