= KBIX =

Radio station in Muskogee, Oklahoma

Simulcast of KMUS, Sperry
- Muskogee, Oklahoma; United States
- Frequency: 1490 kHz
- Branding: Las Americas 1490 AM & 102.9 FM

Programming
- Language: Spanish
- Format: Regional Mexican

Ownership
- Owner: Grupo Teletul Multimedia, LLC
- Sister stations: KMUS; KETU; KXAP-LD

History
- First air date: May 1, 1936

Technical information
- Licensing authority: FCC
- Facility ID: 14893
- Class: C
- Power: 450 watts (unlimited)
- Transmitter coordinates: 35°46′56″N 95°22′37″W
- Translator: 102.9 K275CK (Muskogee)

Links
- Public license information: Public file; LMS
- Webcast: Listen live
- Website: lasamericas1490am.com

KBIX (1490 AM, "Las Americas 1490 AM & 102.9 FM") is an American radio station in Muskogee, Oklahoma, United States. The station is owned by Grupo Teletul Multimedia, LLC. KBIX simulcasts Regional Mexican format with KMUS (1380 AM) in Sperry.

== History ==
KBIX signed on the air on May 1, 1936 and was a charter member of the Oklahoma Network when it was formed in 1937.

On October 21, 2002, Taft Broadcasting, Inc. (not to confused with the company of the same name) announced it would sell KBIX and KHJM to KXOJ, Inc. (later named Stephen Media Group) for $1 million. The sale was completed on December 11. After the sale, KBIX began broadcasts a sports talk format, in part as a simulcast of KYAL-FM (97.1 FM) in Muskogee, as an affiliate of the Sports Animal Network.

On February 18, 2016, KBIX went silent.

On April 15, 2016, Stephens Media Group sold KBIX and its translator to Grupo Teletul Multimedia for $175,000. After the sale was completed, in September, the station resumed operations.

In 2018, KBIX change their format from sports simulcast to Regional Mexican simulcast of KMUS.
