= KYAL =

KYAL may refer to:

- KYAL (AM), a radio station (1550 AM) licensed to Sapulpa, Oklahoma, United States
- KYAL-FM, a radio station (97.1 FM) licensed to Muskogee, Oklahoma, United States
- Know You Are Loved, the slogan of The Executive, a fictional time-travelling organization in Bodies (2023 TV series)
