= KTMT =

KTMT may refer to:

- KTMT (AM), a radio station (580 AM) licensed to Ashland, Oregon, United States
- KTMT-FM, a radio station (93.7 FM) licensed to Medford, Oregon
- Austin Airport (Nevada) (ICAO code KTMT)
