= KCMX =

KCMX may refer to:

- KCMX-FM, a radio station (101.9 FM) licensed to Ashland, Oregon, United States
- KCMX (AM), a defunct radio station (880 AM) formerly licensed to Phoenix, Oregon
- the ICAO code for Houghton County Memorial Airport
