= KEMX =

Radio station in Locust Grove, Oklahoma

- Locust Grove, Oklahoma; United States
- Frequency: 94.5 MHz
- Branding: The Wolf 94.5

Programming
- Format: Active rock

Ownership
- Owner: Key Plus Broadcasting, LLC
- Sister stations: KTFR; KXTD; KCXR

History
- First air date: February 14, 1991
- Former call signs: KWOJ (CP, March–May 1990)

Technical information
- Licensing authority: FCC
- Facility ID: 35973
- Class: A
- ERP: 2,300 watts
- HAAT: 112 meters (367 ft)
- Transmitter coordinates: 36°15′5″N 95°13′21″W

Links
- Public license information: Public file; LMS
- Webcast: Listen live
- Website: www.wolf945.com

KEMX (94.5 FM) is a radio station in Locust Grove, Oklahoma, United States, broadcasting an active rock music format. The station is owned by Key Plus Broadcasting, LLC.

== History ==
On April 25, 2013, Stephens Media Group sold KEMX (along with KCXR and KTFR) to Roger Chasteen's ABS Communications, Inc. for $500,000. The sale would allow Stephens to acquire KMYZ-FM and KTSO. The sale was completed in June.

On June 15, 2015, it was announced that ABS Communications would sell KEMX, KCXR, and KTFR to Key Plus Broadcasting, LLC for $800,000. The sale was completed on August 19.

On May 20, 2026, an FCC filing announced that Key Plus Broadcasting would suspend KEMX's FM operations.
