= KCMX (AM) =

Radio station in Phoenix, Oregon

Phoenix, Oregon; United States
- Broadcast area: Medford-Ashland
- Frequency: 880 kHz
- Branding: News Radio KCMX

Programming
- Format: Defunct (was news/talk)
- Affiliations: Fox News Radio; NBC News Radio; Genesis Communications Network; Premiere Networks; Salem Radio Network; Westwood One

Ownership
- Owner: Stephens Media Group; (SMG-Medford, LLC)
- Sister stations: KAKT, KBOY-FM, KCMX-FM, KTMT, KTMT-FM

History
- First air date: 1962; 64 years ago (as KSHA at 860)
- Last air date: January 10, 2023; 3 years ago
- Former call signs: KMFR (1960–1961); KSHA (1961–1980); KISD (1980–1984); KMFR (1984–1992); KTMT (1992–1999)
- Former frequencies: 860 kHz (1962–1984)

Technical information
- Licensing authority: FCC
- Facility ID: 60314
- Class: B
- Power: 1,000 watts unlimited
- Transmitter coordinates: 42°18′36″N 122°48′41″W
- Translator: 99.5 K258DB (Phoenix)
- Repeater: 105.1 KAKT-HD3 (Phoenix)

Links
- Public license information: Public file; LMS
- Webcast: Listen Live
- Website: kcmxam.com

KCMX (880 kHz) was an AM radio station broadcasting a news/talk format. Licensed to Phoenix, Oregon, United States, the station served the Medford-Ashland area. The station was last owned by Stephens Media Group, through licensee SMG-Medford, LLC.

== History ==
The station was issued an initial construction permit on October 12, 1960, as KMFR, for 1,000 watts daytime-only on 860 kHz. On October 2, 1961, the call sign was changed to KSHA, which was followed by additional call sign changes to KISD on July 21, 1980, back to KMFR on May 3, 1984, and to KTMT in 1992. In 1984 the station moved to 880 kHz.

=== Expanded band assignment ===
On March 17, 1997, the Federal Communications Commission (FCC) announced that 88 stations had been given permission to move to newly available "Expanded Band" transmitting frequencies, ranging from 1610 to 1700 kHz, with KTMT authorized to move from 880 to 1650 kHz. However, the station never procured the Construction Permit needed to implement the authorization, so the expanded band station was never built.

=== Later history ===
The station call sign was changed to KCMX on January 1, 1999.

Stephens Media Group acquired KCMX, along with 36 other Mapleton Communications stations, in 2019.

KCMX left the air January 10, 2023, due to the failure of its transmitter. Stephens Media Group elected to move the station's programming entirely to translator station K258DB (99.5 FM), rebroadcasting the third HD Radio subchannel of KAKT. The KCMX license was surrendered to the FCC on March 13, 2023, who cancelled it the same day.

== Local programming ==
KCMX simulcast KDOV The Dove's morning programs, Mornings On TheDove and Focus Today with Perry Atkinson from 6am to 9am before the Glenn Beck program.

== Translator ==
KCMX also broadcast on the following FM translator:

Broadcast translator for KCMX
Call sign	Frequency	City of license	FID	ERP (W)	Class	FCC info
K258DB	99.5 FM	Phoenix, Oregon	60309	11	D	LMS
