= KQMS =

KQMS may refer to:

- KQMS (AM), a radio station (1400 AM) licensed to serve Redding, California, United States
- KWLZ, a radio station (99.3 FM) licensed to serve Shasta Lake City, California, United States, which held the call sign KQMS-FM from 2010 to 2017
