= Thunder Radio =

Thunder Radio may refer to:

- Thunder Radio Network, provides radio coverage of Oklahoma City Thunder games
- KNDS-LP, in Fargo, North Dakota
- KBWG, in Browning, Montana
- WMSR (AM), in Manchester, Tennessee
