= KITO-FM =

Radio station in Vinita, Oklahoma

Simulcast of KYAL-FM, Muskogee
- Vinita, Oklahoma; United States
- Broadcast area: Northeastern Oklahoma
- Frequency: 96.1 MHz
- Branding: The Sports Animal

Programming
- Format: Sports

Ownership
- Owner: Stephens Media Group; (KXOJ, Inc.)
- Sister stations: KEOJ; KYAL; KYAL-FM

History
- First air date: April 9, 1981
- Former call signs: KITO (1981–1993)

Technical information
- Licensing authority: FCC
- Facility ID: 17034
- Class: C2
- ERP: 50,000 watts
- HAAT: 150 meters (490 ft)
- Transmitter coordinates: 36°34′56″N 95°01′35″W

Links
- Public license information: Public file; LMS
- Webcast: Listen live
- Website: sportsanimalradio.com

KITO-FM (96.1 FM) is a radio station in Vinita, Oklahoma, United States. The station is owned by Stephens Media Group and broadcasts a sports format (simulcast KYAL-FM).

== History ==
On June 24, 2005, DLB Broadcasting Corporation announced it would sell KITO-FM and KITO (AM) to Mid-America Ag Network, Inc. for $900,000.

On June 15, 2007, Mid-America Ag Network, Inc. announced it would sell KITO-FM and KGND to KXOJ, Inc. (later named Stephens Media Group) for $1.8 million.

In August 2012, KITO-FM dropped its country format and began simulcasting KYAL-FM (97.1 FM) in Muskogee.
