= WOTT =

WOTT is a 4-letter combination that can mean:

- For the radio station, see WOTT (FM).
- For the radio station that used the call sign from 1959 to 1982, see WNER.
- For the series of adventure gamebooks set on the fantasy world of Orb, see Way of the Tiger.
