= KHFX (disambiguation) =

KHFX may mean:

- KHFX 1140 in Cleburne, Texas, previously KCLE until September 1, 2008
- KCLE 1460 in Burleson, Texas, previously KHFX until September 1, 2008
- KINE-FM 105.1 Honolulu, Hawaii, previously KHFX starting August 1, 1989
- KBKK 105.5 in Ball, Louisiana, previously KHFX starting July 13, 1998
- KCBJ-LP 15 in Juneau, Alaska, KHFX-LP from April 1 to 22, 2005
