= KMUS =

Radio station in Sperry, Oklahoma

Coordinates: 36°15′59.3″N 95°58′16″W

- Sperry, Oklahoma; United States
- Broadcast area: Tulsa metropolitan area
- Frequency: 1380 kHz (HD Radio)
- Branding: 1380 AM Radio Las Américas

Programming
- Format: Spanish popular music, news; Brokered programming

Ownership
- Owner: Grupo Teletul; (Radio Las Américas, LLC)

History
- First air date: July 3, 1948
- Former call signs: KLUE (1987–1990)
- Call sign meaning: Muskogee (former city of license)

Technical information
- Licensing authority: FCC
- Facility ID: 25129
- Class: B
- Power: 7,000 watts (day); 250 watts (night)
- Translator: 102.7 K274CX (Tulsa)
- Repeater: 1490 KBIX (Muskogee)

Links
- Public license information: Public file; LMS
- Webcast: Listen live
- Website: www.lasamericas1380am.com

KMUS (1380 AM) is a Spanish-language radio station licensed to Sperry, Oklahoma, and serving the Tulsa metropolitan area. It is owned by Radio Las Américas, LLC. KMUS airs a mix of Spanish language hits and talk shows, some of which are paid brokered programming.

By day, KMUS is powered at 7,000 watts. To protect other stations on 1380 AM from interference, it uses a directional antenna with a six-tower array. At night, it reduces power to only 250 watts. Programming is heard around the clock on low-power FM translator K274CX at 102.7 MHz in Tulsa.

== History ==
KMUS began broadcasting in Muskogee, Oklahoma, on July 3, 1948. It changed to KLUE on July 25, 1987, with a format of crossover country. Three years later, the call sign reverted to KMUS and the station aired an adult standards format.

In 1997, the station began airing programming from the "Children's Satellite Network", which was dropped in March 1998. Reunion Broadcasting, LLC sold KMUS to The Walt Disney Company on March 10, 2004. Its transmitter site and city of license was relocated to Sperry, Oklahoma, and the format changed to another children's radio network, Radio Disney. During this time, the station kept the KMUS callsign as a coincidental backronym of Disney character Mickey Mouse.

Disney took KMUS, and five other stations slated to be sold, off the air on January 22, 2010. After the first attempt to sell the station fell through, a deal to sell KMUS to Radio Las Americas LLC was announced in February 2011.

Radio Las Américas returned the station to the air on April 29 with a Spanish-language popular music format, along with two newscasts a day (which are audio-only versions of the newscasts on sister television station KXAP-LD).

== Translator ==
Call sign	Frequency	City of license	FID	ERP (W)	HAAT	Class	FCC info
K274CX	(102.7 MHz) FM	Tulsa, Oklahoma	140408	99	54 m (177 ft)	D	LMS
