= CKXC-FM =

Radio station in Kingston, Ontario

Coordinates: 44°16′49″N 76°29′48″W

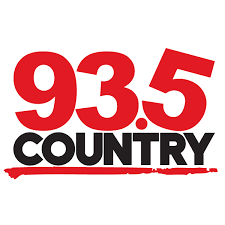
- Kingston, Ontario; Canada
- Broadcast area: Eastern Ontario
- Frequency: 93.5 MHz
- Branding: Country 93.5

Programming
- Format: Country

Ownership
- Owner: Rogers Radio; (Rogers Media, Inc.)
- Sister stations: CIKR-FM

History
- First air date: January 2008
- Call sign meaning: "Kix Country" (former branding)

Technical information
- Class: B
- ERP: 7,500 watts peak
- HAAT: 123 metres (404 ft)

Links
- Website: country935.ca

CKXC-FM (93.5 MHz) is a Canadian radio station in Kingston, Ontario owned by Rogers Radio, a division of Rogers Sports & Media. The station currently broadcasts a country format branded as Country 93.5.

== History ==
The station was originally owned by K-Rock 105.7 Inc., consisting of John P. Wright (60%), Douglas Kirk (15%), and Rogers Broadcasting (25%). The same ownership group also owns CIKR-FM, and operates WLYK in the nearby American community of Cape Vincent, New York through a local marketing agreement.

The station received CRTC approval on August 28, 2007 to operate a new English-language FM radio station in Kingston. However, the 93.5 FM frequency is an adjacent frequency to a nearby radio station WCIZ-FM in Watertown, New York across the St. Lawrence River broadcasting at 93.3 FM. The antenna configuration used by CKXC is directional to protect WCIZ. The 93.5 MHz frequency was formerly used by WCIZ up until the late 1990s.

K-Rock 105.7 launched Kix 93.5 in January 2008. In late November 2008, Rogers announced it would acquire the remainder of the ownership group, pending CRTC approval. Its application was approved by the CRTC on May 4, 2009.

On July 3, 2013, The station dropped the "Kix" branding and rebranded as Country 93.5, as part of Rogers' rebranding of its country-formatted stations to a unified brand.
