= KSHA =

Radio station in Redding, California

Coordinates: 40.654°N 122.521°W

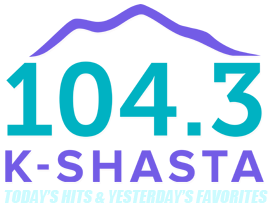
- Redding, California; United States
- Broadcast area: Redding–Red Bluff–Corning
- Frequency: 104.3 MHz
- Branding: K-Shasta

Programming
- Format: Adult contemporary

Ownership
- Owner: Stephens Media Group; (SMG-Redding, LLC)
- Sister stations: KNRO, KQMS, KALF, KWLZ, KRDG

History
- First air date: August 26, 1981; 45 years ago
- Call sign meaning: K-SHAsta

Technical information
- Licensing authority: FCC
- Facility ID: 51641
- Class: C
- ERP: 100,000 watts
- HAAT: 475 meters (1,558 ft)

Links
- Public license information: Public file; LMS
- Webcast: Listen live
- Website: kshasta.com

KSHA (104.3 FM, commonly known as "K-Shasta") is a radio station in Redding, California, one of California's strongest Class C FM stations with its broadcast tower in Shasta Lake, California. K-Shasta airs a "Soft Hits/AC" format targeting the 25-54 demographic with local hosts on during most days, while playing the nationally syndicated Delilah Rene show at night. It is now owned by Stephens Media Group, which also owns its five sister stations in Redding.
