= KETU =

Radio station in Catoosa, Oklahoma

- Catoosa, Oklahoma; United States
- Broadcast area: Tulsa metropolitan area
- Frequency: 1120 kHz
- Branding: KETU La Diferente

Programming
- Language: Spanish
- Format: Adult contemporary

Ownership
- Owner: Antonio Perez; (Radio Las Americas Arkansas, LLC)

History
- First air date: January 29, 1968
- Former call signs: KEOR (1968–2012)
- Former frequencies: 1110 kHz (1968–2008)

Technical information
- Licensing authority: FCC
- Facility ID: 3651
- Class: D
- Power: 10,000 watts day; 7,000 watts critical hours
- Transmitter coordinates: 36°18′25.3″N 95°58′23″W
- Translator: 97.9 K250BN (Tulsa)

Links
- Public license information: Public file; LMS
- Webcast: Listen live
- Website: ladiferentetulsa.com

KETU (1120 AM) is a commercial radio station licensed to Catoosa, Oklahoma, United States, and serving the Tulsa metropolitan area. The station broadcasts a Spanish adult contemporary format and is owned by Antonio Perez, through licensee Radio Las Americas Arkansas, LLC.

The transmitter is on East 106 Street at North 14th Avenue in Sperry. Programming is heard around the clock on 250-watt FM translator K250BN at 97.9 MHz in Tulsa.

== History ==
The station signed on the air on January 29, 1968. Its original call sign was KEOR licensed to Atoka, Oklahoma, and operated for many years on the frequency 1110 kHz. Then, as now, KEOR was a daytimer. It had a power of 5,000 watts but had to go off the air at sunset. It broadcast a country music format and was an affiliate of the ABC Entertainment Network.

KEOR flipped to Top 40 hits in the 1970s. In 1984, KEOR changed to Southern Gospel, after brokering the station to Sonshine Ministries. In the 1990s, Sonshine broker weekday programming to Christian talk and teaching ministries, while Saturday mornings were brokered to Ed and Jolene Bullard, who used their time to play Classic Country and Bluegrass music. KEOR would be sold to Edward J. and Leticia Vega in 2012.

In 2008, the Raftt Corporation, the station's owner, got permission from the Federal Communications Commission to move 100 miles north, into the more lucrative Tulsa radio market. The city of license was switched to Catoosa, a suburb of Tulsa, and the frequency relocated to 1120 kHz, one notch up the dial. Meanwhile, in the early 2000s, some Catholic organizations around the U.S. were looking for radio stations to broadcast Catholic programming, in response to the increasing number of stations proclaiming an Evangelical Christian message.

In January 2009, The Raftt Corporation reached an agreement to sell this station to the Roman Catholic Diocese of Tulsa for $880,000. The deal was approved by the FCC on March 17, 2009. However the transaction was subsequently cancelled. Raftt later sold the station to Edward J. and Leticia Vega's La Zeta 95.7 Inc. The sale was consummated on November 21, 2012, and the station switched its call sign to KETU. La Zeta put a Spanish-language format on KETU.

Effective September 22, 2020, La Zeta 95.7 swapped KETU and $10,000 to Radio Las Americas Arkansas, LLC in exchange for KLTK, a Regional Mexican station in Centerton, Arkansas.

== Translators ==
Call sign	Frequency	City of license	FID	ERP (W)	HAAT	Class	FCC info
K250BN	(97.9 MHz) FM	Tulsa, Oklahoma	140389	250	76 m (249 ft)	D	LMS
