= WTNY =

Radio station in Watertown, New York

Coordinates: 43°56′44″N 75°56′54″W

- Watertown, New York; United States
- Frequency: 790 kHz
- Branding: 790 WTNY The News and Weather Station

Programming
- Format: Talk
- Affiliations: Premiere Networks; Westwood One; Fox News Radio

Ownership
- Owner: Stephens Media Group; (Stephens Media Group Watertown, LLC)
- Sister stations: WCIZ-FM, WFRY-FM, WNER

History
- First air date: April 29, 1941; 84 years ago
- Former call signs: WWNY (1941–1981)
- Call sign meaning: WaterTown, NY

Technical information
- Licensing authority: FCC
- Facility ID: 154
- Class: B
- Power: 1,000 watts
- Translator: 95.9 W240EA (Watertown)

Links
- Public license information: Public file; LMS
- Website: www.790WTNY.com

WTNY (790 AM) is a commercial radio station in Watertown, New York. The station airs a talk radio format and is owned by the Stephens Media Group. The studios and offices are on Mullin Street.

WTNY broadcasts at 1,000 watts. By day it uses a non-directional antenna. But at night, to protect other stations on AM 790 it uses a directional antenna with a three-tower array. The transmitter is on Ives Street Road. WTNY is heard on FM translator W240EA at 95.9 MHz.

== Programming ==
The station features a local weekday morning news and information show hosted by Bill Tinsley. The rest of the weekday schedule is made up of mostly nationally syndicated conservative talk programs. They include The Glenn Beck Radio Program, The Dan Bongino Show, The Ben Shapiro Show, The Dave Ramsey Show, The Alex Jones Show, The Jim Bohannon Show and Coast to Coast AM with George Noory.

Weekends feature repeats of weekday shows, as well as special interest programs on money and health. Sunday mornings feature a smooth jazz show, The Dave Koz Lounge. Most hours being with world and national news from Fox News Radio.

== History ==
On April 29, 1941, the station signed on the air. It was Watertown's second radio station, after 1240 WATN went on the air only three months earlier. The call sign was originally WWNY and it broadcast at 500 watts on 1300 kilocycles. It was owned by the Brockway Company which also owned the Watertown Daily Times newspaper. WWNY had its studios in the Hotel Woodruff at 49 Public Square.

WWNY got a construction permit from the Federal Communications Commission to move to 790 kHz. That was coupled with a power increase to 1,000 watts, giving the station increased coverage. WWNY was a network affiliate of CBS Radio, carrying its dramas, comedies, news, sports, soap operas, game shows and big band broadcasts during the "Golden Age of Radio."

In 1947, an FM station was added, WWNY-FM at 100.3 MHz. The FM station largely simulcast the programs on the AM station. Few people owned FM radios in the 1940s. Management saw little chance to make it profitable, so WWNY-FM was taken off the air in the 1950s and the license turned in to the FCC.

WWNY added a TV station in 1954, Channel 7 WCNY-TV. Because the TV station is licensed to Carthage, New York, outside Watertown, the two stations did not have the same call sign. When the FCC relaxed the rules, the TV station switched to WWNY-TV. (The WCNY-TV call letters are now used on a PBS television station in Syracuse, New York.)

In 1981, the TV station was sold to United Communications. WWNY-TV got to keep its call letters, so AM 790 slightly changed its call sign to WTNY. Through the 1960s, 70s and 80s, WTNY had a middle of the road format of popular adult music, news, sports and talk. But in the 1990s, listeners switched from AM to FM for music. So WTNY added more talk shows and eventually went with an all-talk format. It remained a CBS Radio affiliate for world and national news coverage. In the 2000s, it switched to Fox News Radio as its news network. CBS affiliation was picked up by rival talk station WATN 1240 AM.

Alan Walts, the station's longtime morning host, retired in 2019. He was replaced by veteran Northern New York broadcaster Bill Tinsley. WTNY added an FM translator in 2021. W240EA at 95.9 MHz went on air on July 8 at 3:15 PM.

== Translators ==
Call sign	Frequency	City of license	FID	ERP (W)	Class	FCC info
W240EA	95.9 FM	Watertown, New York	202046	250	D	LMS
