= WFRY-FM =

Radio station in Watertown, New York

Coordinates: 43.956°N 75.845°W

- Watertown, New York; United States
- Broadcast area: Jefferson County, New York
- Frequency: 97.5 MHz
- Branding: Froggy 97

Programming
- Format: Country music

Ownership
- Owner: Stephens Media Group; (Stephens Media Group of Watertown LLC)
- Sister stations: WCIZ-FM, WNER, WTNY

History
- First air date: October 1, 1968
- Former call signs: WOTT-FM (1968–1970); WNCQ (1970–1988); WNCQ-FM (1988); WCIZ (1988–1996); WCIZ-FM (1996–1997)
- Call sign meaning: "Froggy"

Technical information
- Licensing authority: FCC
- Class: C1
- ERP: 97,000 watts
- HAAT: 145 meters (476 ft)

Links
- Public license information: Public file; LMS
- Website: froggy97.com

WFRY-FM (97.5 MHz Froggy 97) is a commercial radio station in Watertown, New York. It is owned by the Stephens Media Group and airs a country music radio format. It has the highest power of any radio station in the Watertown radio market, 97,000 watts, as a Class C1 station.

Studios and offices are on Mullin Street in Watertown. The transmitter is on State Street (Route 126) east of the downtown district.

== History ==
On October 1, 1968, the station first signed on as WOTT-FM. It was the FM counterpart to WOTT (1410 AM, now WNER). The two stations were owned by R.B.G. Productions, and mostly simulcast their programming. At the time, it was powered at 39,000 watts, using a tower at 131 feet in height above average terrain, so its signal was limited compared to today.

In the 1970s, the FM programming split from the AM station. WOTT aired a Top 40 format, while the FM station began airing a largely automated country music format. It switched its call sign to WNCQ. In the 1980s, WNCQ and its country format moved over to AM 1410, while 97.5 FM became WCIZ-FM, airing an album oriented rock format.

“Froggy 97” came on the air as a country station, on January 6, 1997, after WCIZ-FM moved to 93.5 FM. Management believed the country format should be on the more powerful station, reaching into rural areas around Watertown, while the less powerful frequency of 93.5 would be good for the rock format. (WCIZ later moved to 93.3 FM, allowing a new FM station to go on the air in nearby Kingston, Ontario at 93.5.)

“Froggy 97” was originally owned by Pennsylvania-based Forever Broadcasting as part of their chain of Froggy themed country stations. Forever later sold the station to Regent Broadcasting, which in turn sold the radio station to its current owner, the Stephens Media Group based in Tulsa, Oklahoma.
