= KBOY-FM =

Radio station in Medford, Oregon

- Medford, Oregon; United States
- Broadcast area: Medford–Ashland
- Frequency: 95.7 MHz
- Branding: 95.7 KBOY

Programming
- Format: Classic rock
- Affiliations: United Stations Radio Networks; Westwood One

Ownership
- Owner: Stephens Media Group; (SMG Medford, LLC)
- Sister stations: KAKT, KCMX, KCMX-FM, KTMT, KTMT-FM

History
- First air date: March 20, 1959
- Former frequencies: 95.3 MHz (1959–1984)

Technical information
- Licensing authority: FCC
- Facility ID: 33678
- Class: C1
- ERP: 60,000 watts
- HAAT: 299 meters (981 ft)
- Transmitter coordinates: 42°27′11″N 123°3′21″W
- Translator: 96.1 K241AG (Grants Pass)

Links
- Public license information: Public file; LMS
- Webcast: Listen live
- Website: 957kboy.com

KBOY-FM (95.7 FM) is a radio station broadcasting a classic rock music format. Licensed to Medford, Oregon, United States, the station serves the Medford-Ashland area. The station is currently owned by Stephens Media Group, through licensee SMG Medford, LLC.

== Translators ==
KBOY-FM broadcasts on the following translator:

Broadcast translator for KBOY-FM
| Call sign | Frequency | City of license | FID | ERP (W) | Class | FCC info |
|---|---|---|---|---|---|---|
| K241AG | 96.1 FM | Grants Pass, Oregon | 17571 | 100 | D | LMS |
