= KAKT =

Radio station in Phoenix, Oregon

- Phoenix, Oregon; United States
- Broadcast area: Medford–Ashland, Oregon
- Frequency: 105.1 MHz (HD Radio)
- Branding: 105.1 The Wolf

Programming
- Format: Country
- Subchannels: HD2: Classic country "95.1 The Wolf"; HD3: News/talk "99.5 KCMX"

Ownership
- Owner: Stephens Media Group; (SMG-Medford, LLC)
- Sister stations: KBOY-FM, KCMX-FM, KTMT, KTMT-FM

History
- First air date: 1991 (as KHUG-FM)
- Former call signs: KHUG-FM (1984–1991) KROG (1991-1996)
- Call sign meaning: Similar to "cat" (transposed, former branding)

Technical information
- Licensing authority: FCC
- Facility ID: 17573
- Class: C1
- ERP: 52,000 watts
- HAAT: 166 meters (545 ft)
- Transmitter coordinates: 42°25′41″N 123°0′4″W
- Translators: 104.7 K284AE (Ashland); 104.7 K284AF (Grants Pass); HD2: 95.1 K236CI (Medford); HD3: 99.5 K258DB (Phoenix)

Links
- Public license information: Public file; LMS
- Webcast: Listen Live; Listen Live (HD2); Listen Live (HD3)
- Website: thewolf1051.com; thewolf951.com (HD2); kcmxam.com (HD3)

KAKT (105.1 FM, "The Wolf") is a radio station broadcasting a country music format. Licensed to Phoenix, Oregon, United States, the station serves the Medford-Ashland area. The station is currently owned by Stephens Media Group, through licensee SMG-Medford, LLC.

== History ==
Originally holding the KHUG-FM call letters, the station signed on in 1991 as "K-Rogue" KROG with a mostly satellite-fed hot adult contemporary music format.

In early 1996, the station flipped to country music as "Cat Country 105" with the call letters KAKT.

In 2005, KAKT became "105.1 Hank FM" with a gold-based country music format.

In 2011, the station returned to New Country as "105-1 The Wolf."

== Translators ==
KAKT broadcasts on the following translators:

Broadcast translators for KAKT
Call sign	Frequency	City of license	FID	ERP (W)	Class	FCC info
K284AE	104.7 FM	Ashland, Oregon	17572	80	D	LMS
K284AF	104.7 FM	Grants Pass, Oregon	17570	100	D	LMS

Broadcast translator for KAKT-HD2
Call sign	Frequency	City of license	FID	ERP (W)	Class	FCC info
K236CI	95.1 FM	Medford, Oregon	138950	115	D	LMS

Broadcast translator for KAKT-HD3
Call sign	Frequency	City of license	FID	ERP (W)	Class	FCC info
K258DB	99.5 FM	Phoenix, Oregon	60309	11	D	LMS

== HD Radio ==
On April 15, 2019, KAKT launched a classic country format on its HD2 subchannel, branded as "95.1 The Wolf"; the branding refers to its carriage on translator K236CI (95.1 FM).

The HD3 subchannel and K258DB (99.5 FM) carry a news/talk format; this programming had been heard on KCMX (880 AM) prior to its shutdown in 2023, and continues to be branded "99.5 KCMX".
