= CityPlex Towers =

Office complex in Tulsa, Oklahoma

Cityplex Towers
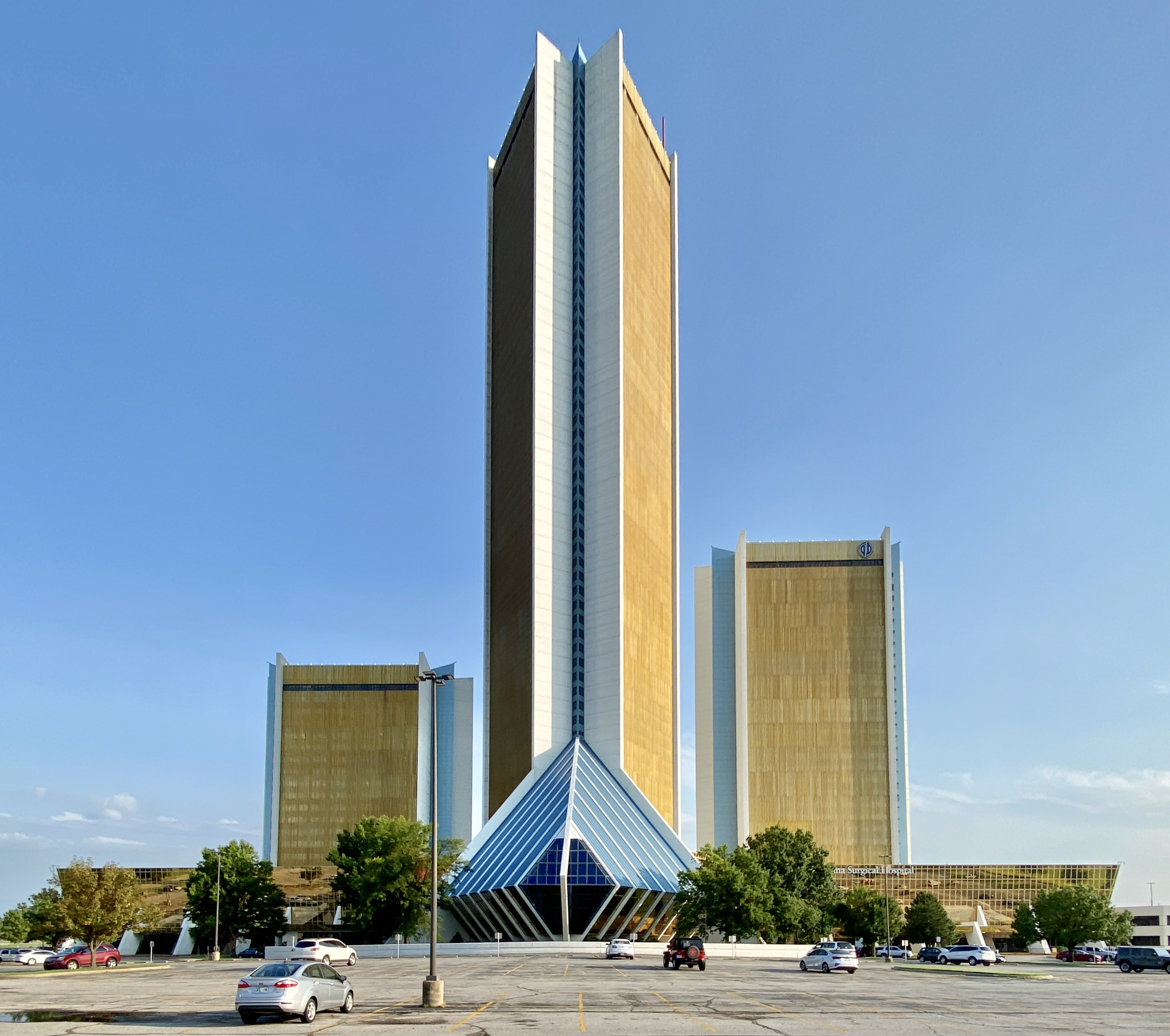
- CityPlex Towers in 2023
- Interactive map of the Cityplex Towers area

General information
- Location: Tulsa, Oklahoma, United States
- Coordinates: 36°02′34″N 95°57′12″W
- Opened: 1979
- Closed: 1981 (ORU Hospital)
- Owner: Oral Roberts University

Technical details
- Floor count: 60 (Corporate Tower 60); 30 (Medical Tower 30); 20 (Corporate Tower 20)
- Lifts/elevators: 13, installed by Dover Corporation (CityPlex Tower)

Design and construction
- Architect: Frank William Wallace

CityPlex Towers is a complex of three high-rise office towers located at 81st Street and Lewis Avenue in Tulsa, Oklahoma. The complex was originally constructed by Oral Roberts University as City of Faith Medical and Research Center and meant to be a major charismatic Christian hospital. The complex is now home to three individual hospitals with over 20 surgery suites as well as 100+ additional tenants.

== History ==
Oral Roberts traveled to California in 1977 after the death of his daughter and son-in-law, who were killed along with five other passengers in a small airplane crash. During the pilgrimage, Roberts had a religious vision in which God directed him to construct the City of Faith Medical and Research Center. The facility was conceived to serve as a nationally renowned healing and research and teaching facility for the medical faculty of the adjacent Oral Roberts University. The hospital was intended to combine the healing disciplines of modern medical science and Biblical principles on healing where volunteer prayer partners would comfort the patients with prayers for healing. A gigantic bronze sculpture entitled "Praying Hands", representing the hands of science and faith clasped together in prayer, was erected at the entrance of the hospital.

=== Early struggles, funding and visions of Jesus ===
Roberts encountered many obstacles during the construction of the City of Faith hospital which was constructed between 1979 and 1981, such as opposition by the Oklahoma health authorities who did not agree that the project was needed. They said that resources would be wasted as overhead increased caused by an abundance of empty beds, and that the hospital would divert medical staff leading to a shortage. Oklahoma City attorney Earl Sneed opposed the hospital as the facility offered a redundant service and Sneed additionally expressed his skepticism toward the discipline of faith healing.

Roberts struggled to find financial support during the early stages of planning. Roberts said that God gave him detailed instructions to realize the completion of City of Faith, and to reassure his partners of the completion of the hospital.

According to a fundraising letter, on May 25, 1980 Roberts prayed for guidance in front of the unfinished hospital. Roberts claimed that a 900-foot (300 m) Jesus encouraged him to continue the project. Jesus said according to Roberts 'I told you I would speak to your 'partners', and through them I will build it'. Roberts described the vision: "when I opened my eyes, there He stood... some 900 feet [300 m] tall, looking at me; His eyes.... Oh! His eyes! He stood a full 300 feet [100 m] taller than the 600 foot [200 m] tall City of Faith." However his opponents were skeptical and suggested that Roberts imagined the vision.

He raised the funds by appealing to his partners, by revealing inspiration from God instructing them how to finance the project. In a fundraising letter, Roberts instructed that if they pledge funds in multiples of $7, $77, $777 then God would bless them abundantly.

=== Completion ===
The hospital accepted its first patient in November 1981. By 1986 the City of Faith was losing over $10 million per year. In 1987, with costs spiraling out of control, the medical center went largely vacant. Roberts told a television audience unless he raised $8 million by March, God would "call him home" (a euphemism for death). The donations goal was reached but Roberts soon began looking for buyers or people to manage the facility. In 1989, only eight years after it opened, the City of Faith was $25 million in debt and Roberts closed the hospital. The last patient left on October 16. Most of the complex was converted to office space and leased out as CityPlex Towers.

== Structure and use ==
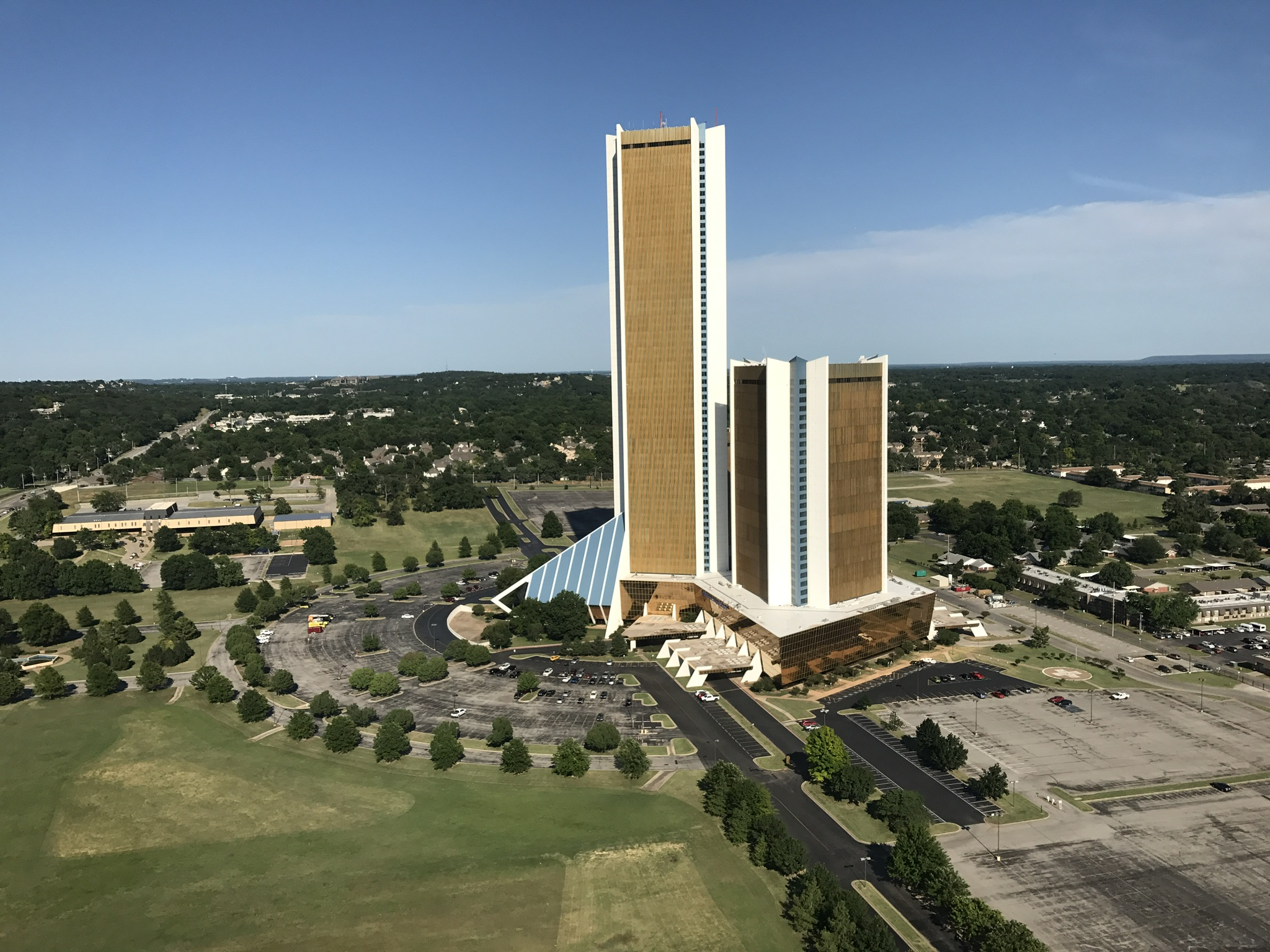
CityPlex Towers, originally known as City of Faith Medical and Research in Tulsa, Oklahoma

There are three triangular towers with over 2,200,000 square feet (200,000 m^{2}) of office space. The tallest is the 60-story Corporate Tower 60 (CityPlex Tower) which at 648 feet (198 m) is the third tallest building in Oklahoma (after Devon Tower and BOK Tower). The 60th floor features a dining room with a panoramic view of the Arkansas River and Tulsa. The main CityPlex tower is flanked by 30-story Medical Tower 30 (CityPlex West Tower) and 20-story Corporate Tower 20 (CityPlex East Tower), which are 348 feet (106 m) and 248 ft (76 m) high. Cityplex West is wholly vacant above the ninth floor, with many floors still unfinished since the time of construction. Below the fifth floor, all three towers are joined within a structure called the base building. The spacious complex includes three auditoriums with theatre-style seating, a fitness center, cafeteria, food court, convenience store and catering services.

Two towers are non-medical. The Cancer Treatment Centers of America was in Medical Tower 30 until April 2005 when they built their own facility. Oklahoma Surgical Hospital, an orthopedic specialty hospital, operates on the lower floors of Medical Tower 30 and the base building. The transmitter facilities of ORU's television station KGEB are located atop the central tower, while Stephens Media's Tulsa cluster of radio stations (made up of KCFO, KTSO, KMYZ-FM and KXOJ-FM) are located on the 57th floor of the central tower (Stephens' transmitter facilities for the stations are elsewhere throughout Tulsa). The leasing agent claims the complex is now a major site for call centers. The facility was 75% occupied in November 2013.

During the 1990s, CityPlex was the home of Commercial Financial Services, a large debt collection agency founded by Bill Bartmann, which at one point had almost four thousand employees, but then filed a high-profile bankruptcy in 1998. In November 2010, it was reported that Bartmann would return to CityPlex with his new debt collection company, CFS II, taking a lease for two floors in the 20-story tower.

The large bronze sculpture Healing Hands sat directly in front of the lobby with a series of fountains and streams headed towards the street until the summer of 1991 when it was moved to the nearby campus entrance of Oral Roberts University.

== See also ==
- MC 900 Ft. Jesus
- List of tallest buildings in Oklahoma
- List of tallest buildings in Tulsa
