= KRDG =

Coordinates: 40.488°N 121.907°W

- Shingletown, California; United States
- Broadcast area: Redding–Red Bluff–Corning
- Frequency: 105.3 MHz
- Branding: Classic Hits 105.3 KRDG

Programming
- Format: Classic hits

Ownership
- Owner: Stephens Media Group; (SMG-Redding, LLC)
- Sister stations: KNRO, KQMS, KWLZ, KSHA

History
- First air date: 1995

Technical information
- Licensing authority: FCC
- Facility ID: 41620
- Class: C1
- ERP: 28,000 watts
- HAAT: 379 meters (1,243 ft)

Links
- Public license information: Public file; LMS
- Website: www.1053classichits.com

KRDG (105.3 MHz) is a commercial radio station licensed to Shingletown, California, broadcasting to Shasta County and Tehama County areas and airs a classic hits format. The station is owned by Stephens Media Group.
