= KNRO =

Radio station in Redding, California

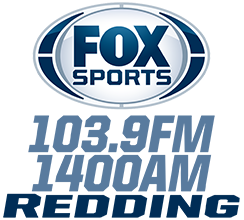
- Redding, California; United States
- Broadcast area: Redding metropolitan area
- Frequency: 1400 kHz
- Branding: Fox Sports Radio 1400 & 103.9

Programming
- Format: Sports
- Affiliations: Fox Sports Radio; Oakland Athletics; Sacramento Kings

Ownership
- Owner: Stephens Media Group; (SMG-Redding, LLC)
- Sister stations: KQMS, KWLZ, KSHA, KRDG

History
- First air date: 1954
- Former call signs: KQMS (1954–2016)

Technical information
- Licensing authority: FCC
- Facility ID: 51639
- Class: C
- Power: 1,000 watts
- Transmitter coordinates: 40°33′30.5″N 122°19′52″W
- Translator: 103.9 K280GP (Redding)

Links
- Public license information: Public file; LMS
- Webcast: Listen live (via iHeartRadio)
- Website: foxsportsredding.com

KNRO (1400 AM) is a radio station that carries a sports format. Licensed to Redding, California, United States, the station serves the Redding and Red Bluff areas. The station is owned by Stephens Media Group, through licensee SMG-Redding, LLC, and features programming from Fox Sports Radio.

== History ==
The station was assigned the call letters KAZT on September 9, 1998, and hit the air at frequency 600 AM. On January 22, 2001, the station changed its call sign to the current KNRO. During much of its life as KNRO the station was primarily a sports format. During that time, the frequency was moved from 600 to 1670 AM. From 2001 to 2010, the station was primarily an ESPN Radio affiliate before changing to Fox Sports Radio.

== Programming ==
KNRO simulcasts all of its programming on translator station K280GP 103.9 FM in Redding, California.

On August 22, 2016, KNRO and its sports format moved to 1400 AM Redding, swapping frequencies with news/talk KQMS, which moved to 1670 AM Redding.

== Past program directors ==
- George Tharalson (2001–2004) – host of The Cheap Seats, also news director of KQMS

== See also ==
- List of radio stations in California

== Translators ==
KNRO broadcasts on the following translator:

Call sign	Frequency	City of license	FID	ERP (W)	Class	FCC info
K280GP	103.9 FM	Redding, California	71798	250	D	LMS
