= KGND =

Radio station in Vinita, Oklahoma

- Vinita, Oklahoma; United States
- Frequency: 1470 kHz
- Branding: KGND AM 1470

Programming
- Format: Sports
- Affiliations: Fox Sports Radio

Ownership
- Owner: Grand Lake Media, LLC; (KXOJ, Inc.)

History
- First air date: December 7, 1954
- Former call signs: KVIN (1954–1993); KITO (1993–2005)
- Call sign meaning: Grand

Technical information
- Licensing authority: FCC
- Facility ID: 17035
- Class: D
- Power: 500 watts (day); 88 watts (night)
- Transmitter coordinates: 36°38′45.4″N 95°07′34.5″W
- Translator: 101.3 K267CC (Vinita)

Links
- Public license information: Public file; LMS

KGND (1470 AM) is a sports radio station in Vinita, Oklahoma, United States and is owned by Grand Lake Media, LLC.

== History ==
On June 24, 2005, DLB Broadcasting Corporation announced it would sell KITO and KITO-FM to Mid-America Ag Network, Inc. for $900,000.

On June 15, 2007, Mid-America Ag Network, Inc. announced it would sell KGND and KITO-FM to KXOJ, Inc. (later named Stephens Media Group) for $1.8 million.

On June 8, 2016, Stephens Media Group agreed to sell KGND to Grand Lake Media for $75,000.
