= KXTD =

Radio station in Wagoner, Oklahoma

- Wagoner, Oklahoma; United States
- Broadcast area: Tulsa metropolitan area
- Frequency: 1530 kHz
- Branding: Que Buena

Programming
- Format: Regional Mexican

Ownership
- Owner: Key Plus Broadcasting, LLC
- Sister stations: KCXR; KEMX; KTFR

History
- First air date: March 1, 1966 (as KWOK)
- Former call signs: KWOK (1966–1984); KTCR (1984–1988)

Technical information
- Licensing authority: FCC
- Facility ID: 61985
- Class: D
- Power: 5,000 watts (daytime only)
- Transmitter coordinates: 35°58′30.4″N 95°29′30.9″W
- Translator: 104.9 K285GW (Tulsa)
- Repeater: 100.3 KCXR (Taft)

Links
- Public license information: Public file; LMS
- Webcast: Listen live
- Website: www.quebuenatulsa.com

KXTD (1530 AM, "Que Buena") is a radio station licensed to Wagoner, Oklahoma, United States, serving the Tulsa metropolitan area. The station is owned by Key Plus Broadcasting, LLC and airs a Regional Mexican music format. KXTD maintains studios (alongside KTFR) on East 31st Street, near South Garnett Road in Tulsa, with its transmitter located in Wagoner.

On March 1, 2015, Gaytan-Galvan LLC sold KXTD to Key Plus Broadcasting, LLC for $100,000.
