= KEDG =

Radio station in Alexandria, Louisiana

- Alexandria, Louisiana; United States
- Broadcast area: Greater Alexandria
- Frequency: 106.9 MHz
- Branding: Sunny 106.9

Programming
- Language: English
- Format: Adult contemporary

Ownership
- Owner: Globecomm Media LLC
- Sister stations: KLAA-FM; KEZP; KBKK

History
- First air date: 1998
- Former call signs: KBGI (1998, CP)
- Call sign meaning: "Edge" (previous format and branding)

Technical information
- Licensing authority: FCC
- Facility ID: 86925
- Class: A
- ERP: 6,000 watts
- HAAT: 100 meters (330 ft)
- Transmitter coordinates: 31°18′26.00″N 92°23′56.00″W

Links
- Public license information: Public file; LMS
- Webcast: Listen live
- Website: sunny1069fm.com

KEDG (106.9 FM) is an American radio station broadcasting an adult contemporary format. Licensed to Alexandria, Louisiana, United States, the station is currently owned by Globecomm Media LLC. Its studios and transmitter are separately located in Pineville.

== History ==
KEDG was originally a modern rock station branded as "Modern Rock Edge 107" until 2000 when Edge 107 was replaced by an urban format as "Kiss 106.9 Alexandria's # 1 For Hip Hop and R&B". Kiss 106.9 lasted until 2006 when Clear Channel sold its Alexandria cluster to Cenla Broadcasting and Cenla replaced Clear Channel's adult contemporary outlet KKST-FM Star 98.7 with the urban KISS format that had been on 106.9 KEDG-FM for 6 years. KKST-FM Star 98.7 was gone and replaced with KEDG-FM's Urban format, branding itself as 98.7 KISS-FM Alexandria's # 1 For Hip Hop and R&B. That of course did not spell the end for STAR, because Flinn Broadcasting adopted the hot adult contemporary format on 106.9 branding it as STAR 106.9, The '80s, '90s & Now and ultimately Alexandria's STAR was reborn in a new home. It has since been under a local marketing agreement by Opus Media Partners, L.L.C. In April 2008, The radio station segued its format from hot ac to adult contemporary and on October 6, 2008, brought the syndicated radio show Delilah to air on the station airing from 6–11 p.m. seven days a week until the station switched to Christmas music in 2009. Delilah is now on from 7-midnight. After Christmas 2008 the station changed its name from star 106.9 to sunny 106.9. the stations slogan was also changed from the '80s '90s and now to Central Louisiana's Best Variety.

At Christmas time Sunny 106.9 played continuous Christmas music from the Friday before Thanksgiving all the way to Christmas Day. At this time the station is generally known as the Christmas Sunny 106.9 with the slogan "Sounds of the season". 2024 was the last year Sunny 106.9 played Continous Christmas Music in November 2025 The 24/7 Christmas music moved to Cenla Broadcastings Magic 100.9

In March 2025, it was announced that Stephens Media Group would be selling its four stations in the Alexandria area to Globecomm Media LLC for $350,000; the sale was completed in June 2025.
