= KEOJ =

Radio station in Caney, Kansas

Simulcast of KYAL-FM, Muskogee, Oklahoma
- Caney, Kansas; United States
- Broadcast area: Bartlesville, Oklahoma
- Frequency: 101.1 MHz
- Branding: The Sports Animal

Programming
- Format: Sports

Ownership
- Owner: Stephens Media Group; (KXOJ, Inc.)
- Sister stations: KYAL; KYAL-FM

History
- First air date: October 15, 1992

Technical information
- Licensing authority: FCC
- Facility ID: 35975
- Class: A
- ERP: 6,000 watts
- HAAT: 100 meters (330 ft)
- Transmitter coordinates: 36°58′19″N 95°53′47″W

Links
- Public license information: Public file; LMS
- Webcast: Listen live
- Website: www.sportsanimalradio.com

KEOJ (101.1 FM) is a radio station licensed to Caney, Kansas, United States, and serving the Bartlesville, Oklahoma area. The station is currently owned by Stephens Media Group. The station broadcasts a sports format as simulcast of KYAL-FM (98.1) in Muskogee, Oklahoma.
