= Bill Bartmann =

American businessman (1948–2016)

William R. Bartmann (1948 – November 29, 2016) was the founder and CEO of CFS2, Inc, a consumer financial recovery company based in Tulsa, Oklahoma. From 1986 to 1999, Bartmann was CEO of Commercial Financial Services Inc., the nation's biggest debt collection company. One officer of the company was accused of being involved in accounting fraud and the company filed for Chapter 11 bankruptcy though allegations of wider fraud were later determined to be untrue.

== Personal life ==
Bartmann was born in Dubuque, Iowa in 1948. At age 14, he dropped out of high school and joined a travelling carnival. He later joined a gang called the Manor Boys. He attempted to join the Marines but was rejected for hearing problems. Bartmann became an alcoholic by age 17, and one night fell down a flight of stairs while drunk. He became paralyzed and was told that he would never walk again. Against his doctor's wishes, Bartmann embarked on a nightly regimen of physical activity until he eventually regained the use of his legs.

For several years, Bartmann worked at the Dubuque Packing Company, a large local slaughterhouse. While there, Bartmann organized a wildcat strike to force the company to give benefits to part-time workers. The strike was successful. Around this time, Bartmann ran into a high school principal who earlier had expelled him from school. The principal challenged Bartmann to get his GED certificate, which he did. Bartmann later earned a BS from Loras College and a JD from Drake University.

After passing the Iowa Bar Exam, Bartmann immediately went into private practice, specializing in consumer law. He also invested in real estate. Bartmann moved to Muskogee, OK to devote full-time to real estate investing. Bartmann was later asked by a local bank to take over a struggling oil equipment company in Oklahoma. He turned around the company and grew it substantially. It folded in 1985 due to falling oil prices, with Bartmann one million dollars in debt due to personally guaranteeing some of the corporate obligations. Bartmann died at the age of 68 due to complications shortly after heart bypass surgery on November 29, 2016.

== Commercial Financial Services ==
Hounded by debt collectors, Bartmann looked for other opportunities. He saw an ad in the newspaper about buying defaulted loans from the federal government. He bought a portfolio of loans, financed by the bank he was $1 million in debt to. Bartmann succeeded in collecting enough money from that first portfolio to recoup the cost of the portfolio, plus make a partial repayment on his bank debt. That led to more purchases of loan portfolios that allowed Bartmann to repay the entire $1 million obligation. Bartmann created a consumer-friendly company that would buy delinquent debts from banks and then attempt to restructure them according to terms the customer could afford. The strategy was successful, he was able to help 4.5 million consumers resolve $15 billion in debt, all of it without ever suing a consumer, producing net margins as high as 48%.

CFS didn't make any profit on collecting debt balances, but from paying 5 cents on the dollar for consumer debt accounts that had been charged off from banks. This enabled CFS to only have to collect 10 cents on each dollar of outstanding debt and double their initial investment. But the exorbitant profits of CFS came from securitizations collateralized by charge-off consumer debt. So profitable, that for every $100 million in collateralized securitizations, CFS immediately profited by $40 million. This did nothing to correct or improve a consumer's credit profile or score.

By 1997, Bartmann was listed in Forbes magazine as one of the 400 richest people in America. Inc. magazine estimated Bartmann's net worth to be in the range of $2.4 to $3.5 billion. Goldman Sachs offered to buy a 20% stake in the company and Norwest Bank offered to acquire, but Bartmann refused both offers.

As the company grew, Bartmann gained a reputation for doing the unexpected. He challenged his staff that if they beat their performance goals, he would take them all to Las Vegas. They exceeded the target and Bartmann flew the entire company to Las Vegas. Bartmann arrived and wrestled Hulk Hogan at the Thomas & Mack Center in Vegas." On another occasion, Bartmann leased 27 Boeing 747 Jumbo Jets to fly thousands of employees to Disney World for the weekend. CFS offered free on-site daycare that grew to 500 children, as well as free full health care and a 250% company match in its 401(k) program. BusinessWeek magazine called CFS "One of the top 10 family-oriented businesses in America" and Working Mother Magazine named it "One of the top 100 best companies for working mothers."

In 1998 the Harvard Business School published a case study on the methods Commercial Financial Services used to securitize non-performing debt. The Smithsonian Institution's Museum of American History awarded CFS its Computer World award for technological innovations.

Also in 1998, an investigation began after an anonymous letter raised questions about the propriety of certain transactions at the company by a rogue employee. Throughout the ensuing investigation, Bartmann maintained his innocence. Jay Jones, a shareholder of the company, later confessed to the questionable transactions and admitted that Bartmann did not know about them. Nevertheless, the U.S. Department of Justice persuaded a third grand jury to indict Bartmann and other senior executives.

In the trial that followed, Bartmann was found to be not guilty of all charges. One of Bartmann's co-defendants sued the government for malicious prosecution and won. Even so, the controversy meant his company could not obtain financing and Commercial Financial Services declared bankruptcy. A bankruptcy trustee liquidated the company, laying off its 3900+ employees.

In 2005, the bankruptcy trustee for Commercial Financial Services publicly declared that the company had not engaged in fraud. Bartmann was cleared of all wrongdoing.

== Other activities ==
In 2002, the Governor appointed Bartmann to the board of Oklahoma Futures, a public-private partnership whose goal was to advise the governor, legislature, and judiciary on ways to promote economic development in Oklahoma. The Senate confirmed Bartmann's nomination.

In 2003 Bartmann founded Bill Bartmann Enterprises in order to offer business training and information to entrepreneurs. In 2008 he noticed that the banking bailout and TARP subsidies presented an opportunity to buy defaulted debt from troubled banks, mirroring the situation he built Commercial Financial Services on in the 1980s and 1990s. Bartmann developed a series of training programs to enable individuals to buy portfolios of defaulted credit-card debt and then taught them how to collect without using litigation or other abusive behaviour.

In 2009 Bartmann published a book, "Bailout Riches", which describes the opportunity he says the bank-bailout and recession of 2008-2010 has created. The book became a #1 worldwide bestseller on Amazon, and also made it to the Wall Street Journal, USA Today and BusinessWeek bestseller lists.

In 2010 Bill Bartmann Enterprises was named to the "Inc. 500" for 2009. It's the fifth time Bartmann has made the list.

== CFS2 ==
Bartmann re-established his former consumer financial recovery company, naming the successor entity, CFS2, in July 2010. Later that year the company leased space at the CityPlex Towers complex in south Tulsa, returning Bartmann to the location where CFS had previously operated. Bartmann is in the midst of reviewing potential sites across the country for expansion, with Nevada, North Carolina, Ohio and Arkansas having offered incentives. CFS2 offers a multitude of free services to those they are collecting from, including: employment assistance, credit specialists who negotiate reductions of other personal debt, resume writing, medical discounts and help to access government assistance. An anomaly in the debt collection industry, CFS2 has pledged to never litigate in order to collect from their accounts and has encouraged others in his industry to follow his lead. This helping hand approach reduces the banks reputational risk while enabling CFS2 to collect at rates twice the industry average.

In April 2013 CFS2 became the first and only collection company to ever win The American Consumer Council's "Friend of the Consumer" award. In bestowing the award American Consumer Council CEO, Thomas Hinton, remarked "as a financial recovery company, CFS2 is offering valued services that millions of consumers desperately need as we emerge from one of the longest recessions in our nation's history." In 2014 he won this award for the second time. CFS2 has also won the Compass Award for Business Ethics; the Beacon Award for Community Involvement the “Stevie” Award for Customer Service, and has been named as one of the most admired CEO's in Oklahoma by the Oklahoma Journal Record.

In October 2013 CFS2 was featured on CBS Evening news as the debt collector who thrives using the strategy of kindness.

== Industry reform efforts ==
In the 1990s Bartmann gained a reputation for collecting debts by avoiding strong-arm tactics. He is following the same consumer-advocate approach in his new company, CFS2. He says: "We’re going to go at it the same way we did before, treating people with respect and helping them out of bad situations." A Bartmann-run website, StopTheseCriminals.com, urges consumers to sign a petition that calls for drastic legislative and regulatory reforms of the debt-collection industry. Among those recommended reforms are the barring of all collection efforts on debt that is older than the statute of limitations; allowing consumers to record telephone calls from collection agencies; and requiring the licensing of both agencies and individual collectors.

Bartmann has persuaded 200 Debt Buying companies to take the “Bartmann Pledge’. The Bartmann Pledge requires all signors to agree not to use litigation against debtors; not to charge interest on the obligation, not to attempt to contact debtors more than twice in one day, not to pursue debtors beyond the statute of limitations and not to resell delinquent loans.

Bartmann has worked with members of the U.S. House of Representatives and U.S. Senate to reform the current federal debt-collection rules. In addition he helped to enact a recent change to the Oklahoma debt-collection rules, which the Governor of Oklahoma signed into law in June 2011.

Bartmann authored Oklahoma Senate bill 1430 “The Bartmann Bill” which would require debt collectors to follow stringent practices designed to protect consumers. This bill passed the Senate 40–2. In 2011 Bartmann was nominated to the Consumer Advisory Board of the Consumer Financial Protection Bureau (CFPB) by the president of the American Bankers Association (ABA), Frank Keating. The nomination was seconded by six sitting state attorneys general.

In October 2012, Bartmann was invited to the West Wing of the White House to meet with the deputy director of the National Economic Council and Senior Policy Advisers to discuss the creation of a moratorium on debt collection litigation that would reduce the national bankruptcy rate by as much as 50% while also reducing the national unemployment rate. Bartmann has worked extensively with Attorneys General across the United States to promote debt collection reforms and has testified as an expert witness at their request at numerous proceedings.

Bartmann is a regular contributor to publications like The Huffington Post and The Christian Science Monitor. He authored Out of Control: Cases of Debt-Collection Abuse In America And What We Can Do About It, an expose of the debt collection industry.

In July 2013 Bartmann was nominated for the 2014 Nobel Peace Prize for his debt collection industry reform efforts.

In April 2014, The Governor of Oklahoma appointed Bartmann to the Council of Bond Oversight. This five-member Council is responsible for reviewing and approving all financing requests by state agencies, authorities, departments and trusts.
