= KCFO =

Radio station in Tulsa, Oklahoma

- Tulsa, Oklahoma; United States
- Broadcast area: Tulsa metropolitan area
- Frequency: 970 kHz
- Branding: KCFO AM 980

Programming
- Format: Christian talk and teaching/Conservative talk
- Affiliations: Salem Radio Network

Ownership
- Owner: Stephens Media Group; (SMG-Tulsa, LLC)
- Sister stations: KMYZ-FM; KTSO; KXOJ-FM; KYAL; KYAL-FM

History
- First air date: December 24, 1946
- Former call signs: KAKC (1946–1984)
- Former frequencies: 1570 kHz (1946–1948)

Technical information
- Licensing authority: FCC
- Facility ID: 22665
- Class: B
- Power: 2,500 watts days; 1,000 watts nights
- Transmitter coordinates: 36°11′46.3″N 96°02′23″W

Links
- Public license information: Public file; LMS
- Webcast: Listen live
- Website: kcfo.com

KCFO (970 AM) is a commercial radio station in Tulsa, Oklahoma, United States. It is owned by the Stephens Media Group and it airs a radio format that mixes Christian talk and teaching along with conservative talk. KCFO airs national shows such as Dave Ramsey, J. Vernon McGee, David Jeremiah, Dennis Prager, Mike Gallagher, and Albert Mohler.

By day, KCFO is powered at 2,500 watts. But to protect other stations on 970 AM from interference, it reduces power to 1,000 watts at night.

The station has been assigned the KCFO call letters by the Federal Communications Commission since October 21, 1984.

== History ==
=== Beginnings on 1570 ===
KAKC first signed on the air on Christmas Eve, December 24, 1946. It was founded by Sam Avey. Avey was a local businessman and sports promoter, who owned the Tulsa Coliseum.

When KAKC first went on the air, it was a daytime only station. It was called "The Hometown Station," with a focus on serving the Tulsa community, broadcasting local sports, local news, and some music. It originally broadcast at 1570 kilocycles on the AM dial. In April 1948, the station got permission to move to 970 AM, and it also received permission to broadcast in the evenings as well as during the day.

=== The Top 40 era ===
In the mid-1950s, the station got new ownership and hired Vic Lundberg and Greg Chancellor as announcers. From the late 1950s to the mid-1970s, KAKC 970 AM played Top 40 hits.

Known first as "The Big 97" and later "The Rockin' 97", the station was owned (along with KAKC-FM 92.9) by S. Carl Mark. Both stations used consultant Bill Drake for their programming. KAKC 970 was the dominant Top 40 music station for much of the 1960s and early 70s in Tulsa. Then in the mid-1970s, long-time Top 40 competitor 1430 KELI (now known as KTBZ and FM upstart KTFX "The Superfox 103" (now KRHZ "103.3 The Eagle") cut into KAKC's audience.

=== Simulcast on FM ===
KAKC-FM 92.9 FM in the 1970s used an automated oldies format during the day. It was programmed by radio consultants Drake-Chenault. From 6 p.m. to midnight, the FM simulcasted with KAKC 970 to make up for the AM's weak 250-watt nighttime signal. In the summer of 1977 KAKC-FM flipped to beautiful music and changed its call letters to KBEZ-FM (now KRQV). The station played quarter-hour sweeps of mostly soft instrumental music.

But that left 970 AM without an FM outlet at night. This led to management deciding the discontinue Top 40 hits on KAKC.

=== Adult standards and Southern Gospel ===
Old logo used until 2014.

In January 1979, KAKC shocked the Tulsa radio market by dropping Top 40 programming after 21 years, and flipped to adult standards. But that format was not successful in the ratings, either. A year later in 1980, the station was purchased by Salem Communications (owner of 98.5 KCFO-FM [now KXBL] at the time).

New management changed the format on 970 AM to Southern Gospel music and Christian talk programming.

In 1984, the legendary 970 call letters were changed to KCFO and currently has a mix of Christian talk and teaching programs with conservative talk political shows.

In March 1990, Salem sold KCFO to Friendship Broadcasting for $953,000.

On July 28, 2015, it was announced that KCFO would be acquired by Stephens Media Group from Friendship Broadcasting for $575,000.
