= KZRZ =

Radio station in West Monroe, Louisiana

Coordinates: 32.661°N 91.991°W

- West Monroe, Louisiana; United States
- Broadcast area: Greater Monroe
- Frequency: 98.3 MHz
- Branding: Sunny 98.3

Programming
- Language: English
- Format: Adult contemporary
- Affiliations: Compass Media Networks

Ownership
- Owner: Warrior Media LLC
- Sister stations: KNNW; KMYY; KXRR

History
- First air date: February 29, 1968 (as KUZM-FM)
- Former call signs: KUZN-FM (1967–1969); KYEA (1969–1993)

Technical information
- Licensing authority: FCC
- Facility ID: 52510
- Class: C2
- ERP: 50,000 watts
- HAAT: 150 meters (490 ft)

Links
- Public license information: Public file; LMS
- Webcast: Listen live
- Website: sunny983.com

KZRZ (98.3 FM, "Sunny 98.3") is an adult contemporary formatted radio station licensed to West Monroe, Louisiana, United States, serving the Greater Monroe area. It is owned by Warrior Media LLC. The station began broadcasting February 29, 1968, as KUZN-FM, owned with KUZN (1310 AM). Studios are located in Monroe, and its transmitter is located near Sterlington, Louisiana.

Sunny 98.3 is home to The Kidd Kraddick Morning Show and the John Tesh Radio Show. All the music is programmed locally. Sunny 98.3 is home to the Santa Stop promotion where Santa makes his first seasonal appearance in late November.

In June 2025, it was announced that Stephen Media Group would be selling its Monroe stations to Warrior Media LLC for $450,000. The sale was completed in August 2025.

Prior to 1993, 98.3 was urban contemporary KYEA K-98.
