= KQMS (AM) =

Radio station in Redding, California

Coordinates: 40°33′30.5″N 122°19′52″W

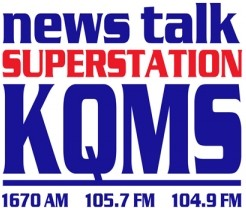
- Redding, California; United States
- Broadcast area: Redding metropolitan area
- Frequency: 1670 kHz
- Branding: NewsTalk 105.7 KQMS

Programming
- Format: Conservative talk
- Affiliations: Fox News Radio; Compass Media Networks; Premiere Networks; Westwood One

Ownership
- Owner: Stephens Media Group; (SMG-Redding, LLC)
- Sister stations: KNRO, KWLZ, KSHA, KRDG

History
- First air date: 2000 (as KAZT)
- Former call signs: KAZT (1998–2001); KNRO (2001–2016)
- Call sign meaning: K Quality Music Station (before news/talk format took over)

Technical information
- Licensing authority: FCC
- Facility ID: 87171
- Class: B
- Power: 10,000 watts day 1,000 watts night
- Translators: 104.9 K285FE (Redding); 105.7 K289BT (Anderson)

Links
- Public license information: Public file; LMS
- Webcast: Listen Live
- Website: kqms.com

KQMS (1670 AM, "NewsTalk 105.7 KQMS") is a radio station in Redding, California. Owned by Stephens Media Group, it broadcasts a conservative talk format. The station is also carried on FM translators on 105.7 in Anderson (from which the station derives its current branding), and 104.9 in Redding.

== History ==
KQMS originated as the expanded band "twin" of an existing station on the standard AM band. In 1936 a new station was licensed in Redding as KVCV, which became KSXO in 1977, KHTE in 1989, and KNRO in 1993. The station switched to the fast-growing news/talk format in the late 1980s.

On March 17, 1997, the Federal Communications Commission (FCC) announced that eighty-eight stations had been given permission to move to newly available "Expanded Band" transmitting frequencies, ranging from 1610 to 1700 kHz, with KNRO authorized to move from 600 to 1670 kHz. A construction permit for the expanded band station was assigned the call letters KAZT on January 9, 1998. On January 22, 2001, there was a call letter swap, with KAZT transferred from 1670 AM to 600 AM, while the reverse was true for KNRO, which moved from 600 AM to 1670 AM.

An FCC policy mandated that both the original station and its expanded band counterpart could operate simultaneously for up to five years, after which owners would have to turn in one of the two licenses, depending on whether they preferred the new assignment or elected to remain on the original frequency. It was ultimately decided to transfer full operations to the expanded band station, and on June 25, 2001, the license for original station, KAZT on 600 AM, was cancelled.

On August 21, 2016, there was a second call letter and format swap between two Redding stations, which this time saw the call sign KQMS and a news/talk format moving from 1400 AM to 1670 AM, while the KNRO call sign and its sports format moved from 1670 AM to 1400 AM. The new call letters stood for "Quality Music Station", based on various earlier music formats.

KQMS simulcasted all of its programming with sister station KQMS-FM 99.3 until January 15, 2017, when 99.3 FM dropped the simulcast, while continuing on 105.7 and 104.9 FM.

== Programming ==
The station was the longtime home of popular conservative talk show host Rush Limbaugh until 2021 when the show ended its run four months after Limbaugh's death from cancer. Several different hosts also have their shows currently on KQMS including Dan Bongino, Sean Hannity, Glenn Beck and Michael Knowles. The station news team and on-air talent includes Steve Gibson, Kelly Frost Sr. and Kelly Frost Jr.

== Alumni ==
Among former radio personalities that have worked at or have hosted programs on KQMS include top talent from the past:

- Don Kirk – Late 1990 Weekend KQMS/KSHA Board-Op and Former KPAK Operations Manager & KPAK Morning Drive personality
- Bob Meyer – News Director
- Ken Murray – Former mayor of Redding
- George Newcom – Openline host, program director & news director
- Sonny Stupek – High school color analyst (former head softball coach and former head football coach at Shasta College, now retired. Also former junior college coach of Jason Sehorn)
- George Tharalson – News Director, High School Sports and Shasta College football play-by-play (also formerly associated with Action Video Entertainment)
- Paul Vietti – Shasta College football color commentator (formerly with KRCR and KMCA-AM)

== Previous logos ==
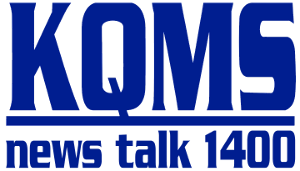

== Translators ==
KQMS broadcasts on the following translators:

Call sign	Frequency	City of license	FID	ERP (W)	Class	FCC info
K289BT	105.7 FM	Anderson, California	156510	250	D	LMS
K285FE	104.9 FM	Redding, California	154828	99	D	LMS
