= Stephens Media Group (broadcasting) =

American radio broadcasting company

- Type: Private
- Industry: Mass media
- Founded: 2008; 18 years ago
- Founder: David Stephens
- Headquarters: Tulsa, Oklahoma, United States
- Products: Radio broadcasting
- Website: smgexchange.com

Stephens Media Group is an American radio broadcasting company headquartered in Tulsa, Oklahoma that currently owns 65 radio stations particularly in small to mid-size markets. Stephens refers to itself as "A portfolio of people", referencing the team members who work for the company.

== History ==
Stephens Media Group started with stations around Tulsa, Oklahoma (with KXOJ-FM [now KTSO] as its main flagship station), before expanding to other markets.

In October 2007, Regent Communications announced it would sell its Watertown, New York radio cluster to Stephens for $6.25 million.

On February 1, 2008, Stephens Media Group acquired six New York stations fro, Martz Communications Group for $5.095 million.

On May 1, 2008, Stephens Media Group announced that it would acquire WFKL, WRMM-FM, and WZNE in Rochester, New York for $13.25 million, as a part of Entercom's purchase of stations from CBS Radio in the market.

On April 25, 2013, it was announced that Stephens Media Group would acquire KTSO and KMYZ-FM in Tulsa from Times-Shamrock Communications; the sale was completed in October for $8.5 million. The same day, Stephens Media Group agreed to sell KCXR, KEMX, and KTFR to ABS Communications, Inc. for $500,000. This would allow Stephens to acquire KMYZ and KTSO. The sale was completed in June.

On July 28, 2015, it was announced that Stephens Media Group would acquire KCFO from Friendship Broadcasting for $575,000.

In March 2016, Stephens Media Group purchased four Ardmore, Oklahoma stations from LKCM Radio for an undisclosed amount.

On April 15, 2016, Stephens Media Group agreed to sell KBIX and its translator to Grupo Teletul Multimedia for $175,000.

In June 2016, Stephens Media Group sold KGND to Grand Lake Media for $75,000.

In April 2018, Ingstad Radio sold 14 of its stations in Washington to Stephens Media Group for $10.725 million.

In July 2019, it was announced that Stephens would acquire 37 stations from Mapleton Communications for $21 million. This acquisition was approved on October 9, 2019, and was completed on October 15, 2019.

In March 2025, it was announced that the company would be selling its four stations in the Alexandria area to Globecomm Media for $350,000 and the sale was completed in June 2025.

In June 2025, it was announced that Stephens Media Group would be selling its Monroe stations to Warrior Media LLC for $450,000. The sale was completed in August 2025.

== Radio stations ==
=== Oklahoma ===
==== Tulsa, Oklahoma (Flagship) ====
- KTSO 100.9 Soft oldies, better known as "100.9 KTSO"
- KXOJ-FM 94.1 Christian adult contemporary
- KCFO 970 Talk
- KMYZ-FM 104.5 Alternative, better known as "Z104.5 The Edge"
- KYAL 1550 Sports, better known as "Sports Animal ESPN Radio"
- KYAL-FM 97.1 Sports, better known as "Sports Animal"

==== Bartlesville, Oklahoma ====
- KEOJ 101.1 Sports, simulcast of KYAL-FM

==== Ardmore, Oklahoma ====
- KKAJ-FM 95.7 Country, better known as "Texoma Country"
- KTRX 92.7 Contemporary hits, known as Star 92.7, Today's Best Music
- KVSO 1240 Sports talk, simulcast on 107.5 K298CR (Ardmore)
- KYNZ 107.1 Classic hits, formerly known as "GTO 107"

==== Vinta, Oklahoma ====
- KITO-FM 96.1 Sports, simulcast of KYAL-FM

=== New York ===
==== Massena, New York ====
- WRCD 101.5 Classic rock, better known as "The Fox"
- WVLF 96.1 Adult contemporary, better known as "The Mix"
- WMSA 1340 News/talk simulcast on 92.9 FM

==== Ogdensburg, New York ====
- WNCQ-FM 102.9 Country, better known as "Q-Country"
- WPAC 98.7 Oldies, better known as "PAC 98.7"
- WYSX 96.7 CHR, better known as "Yes-FM"

==== Rochester, New York ====
- WFKL 93.3 Adult hits, better known as "Fickle 93.3"
- WRMM-FM 101.3 Adult contemporary, better known as "Warm 101.3"
- WZNE 94.1 Alternative, better known as "94.1 The Zone"

==== Watertown, New York ====
- WCIZ-FM 93.3 Classic hits, better known as "Z93"
- WFRY-FM 97.5 Country, better known as "Froggy"
- WNER 1410 Sports talk, better known as "Fox Sports Radio" Simulcast on 97.9 FM
- WTNY 790 News/Talk Simulcast on 95.9 FM

=== California ===
==== Chico, California ====
- KALF 95.7 Country, better known as "The Wolf"

==== Merced, California ====
- KUBB 96.3 Country, better known as "Cubb Country"
- KABX-FM 97.5 Adult contemporary, better known as "K97.5"
- KLOQ-FM 98.7 Regional Mexican, better known as "Radio Lobo"
- KHTN 104.7 Rhythmic CHR, better known as "Hot 104.7"
- KYOS 1480 News/Talk
- KBRE 1660 Active rock, better known as "105.7 The Bear". Simulcast on 105.7 K289CB (Los Banos)

==== Monterey–Salinas-Santa Cruz, California ====
- KCDU 101.7 CHR, better known as "The Beach"
- KPIG-FM 107.5 Americana, better known as "The Pig"
- KHIP 104.3 Classic rock, better known as "The Hippo"
- KKHK 95.5 Alternative rock, better known as "Bob-FM"
- KWAV 96.9 Adult contemporary, better known as "K-Wave"

==== Redding, California ====
- KQMS 1670 News Talk 1670 Simulcast on 104.9 K285FE (Redding) & 105.7 K289BT (Anderson)
- KSHA 104.3 Adult contemporary better known as "K-Shasta"
- KWLZ 99.3 CHR, better known as "Wild 99-3"
- KRRX 106.1 Active rock better known as "106X"
- KNRO 1400 Sports talk better known as "Fox Sports" Simulcast on 103.9 K280GP (Redding)
- KRDG 105.3 Classic hits

=== Oregon ===
==== Medford, Oregon ====
- KTMT 580 Sports talk, better known as "The Game"
- KTMT-FM 93.7 Christian contemporary, better known as "Joy! 93.7"
- KBOY-FM 95.7 Classic rock
- KCMX-FM 101.9 Adult contemporary, better known as "Lite 102"
- KCMX 101.9 (93.3) HD3 CHR, better known as "HiTS 93.3"
- KAKT 105.1 Country, better known as "The Wolf"

=== Washington ===
==== Spokane, Washington ====
- KBBD 103.9 Adult hits, better known as "Bob-FM"
- KDRK-FM 93.7 Country, better known as "The Mountain"
- KEYF-FM 101.1 Classic hits
- KGA 1510 Sports talk, Better known as "103.5 The Game", Simulcast on 103.5 K278CY (Spokane)
- KJRB 790 Classic rock, better known as "94.1 The Bear", Simulcast on 94.1 K231CU (Spokane)
- KZBD 105.7 CHR, better known as "NOW-FM"

==== Tri-Cities, Washington ====
- KUJ-FM 99.1 CHR, better known as "Power 99.1"
- KIOK 94.9 Country, better known as "The Wolf"
- KEGX 106.5 Classic rock, better known as "The Eagle"
- KKSR 95.7 Classic hits, better known as "Big 95-7"
- KALE 960 Christian contemporary, better known as "106.1 The Bridge", Simulcast on 106.1 K291BS (Richland)
- KJOX 1340 sports talk, ESPN Radio

==== Yakima, Washington ====
- KARY-FM 100.9 Classic hits, better known as "Cherry FM"
- KBBO 1390 is a sports talk station, better known as "The Fan", Simulcast on 104.5 K283BX (Wapato)
- KHHK 99.7 Rhythmic-CHR, better known as "Hot 99.7"
- KTCR 980 Oldies, better known as "Kruzn 106.9 KTCR", Simulcast on 106.9 K295BT (Wapato)
- KRSE 105.7 Classic rock, better known as "The Hawk"
- KXDD 104.1 Country, better known as "KX-Double-D"

== Former stations ==
=== Louisiana ===
==== Alexandria, Louisiana ====
- KLAA-FM 103.5 Country, better known as "LA 103.5"
- KEZP 104.3 Christian Adult Contemporary, better known as "The Bridge"
- KBKK 105.5 Classic Country, better known as "K-Buck"
- KEDG 106.9 Adult contemporary, better known as "Sunny 106.9"

==== Monroe, Louisiana ====
- KMYY 92.3 Country, better known as "The Wolf"
- KNNW 103.1 CHR, better known as "Now FM"
- KXRR 106.1 Rock, better known as "Rock 106"
- KZRZ 98.3 Adult Contemporary, better known as "Sunny 98.3"

=== Oklahoma ===
==== Locust Grove, Oklahoma ====
- KEMX 94.5 Contemporary Christian, simulcast of KXOJ

==== Taft, Oklahoma ====
- KCXR 100.3 Contemporary Christian, simulcast of KXOJ

==== Tulsa, Oklahoma (Flagship) ====
- KTFR 100.5 Contemporary Christian, simulcast of KXOJ

==== Vinta, Oklahoma ====
- KGND 1470 Sports, better known as "KGND AM 1470"

=== Oregon ===
==== Medford, Oregon ====
- KCMX 880 News/talk, better known as "News Radio KCMX"
