= WCIZ-FM =

Radio station in Watertown, New York

Coordinates: 43.956°N 75.845°W

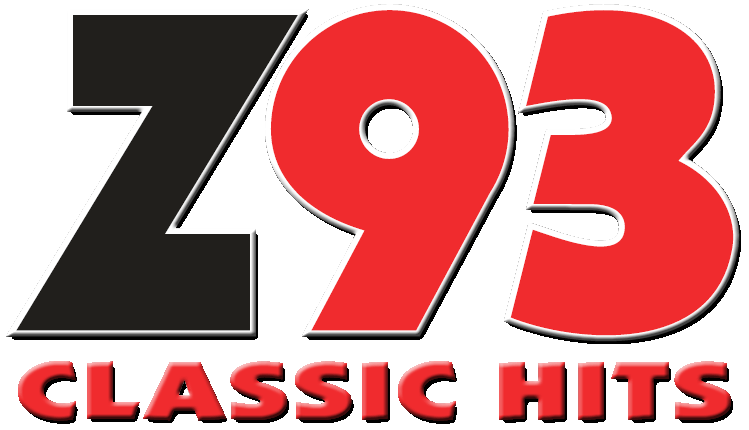
- Watertown, New York; United States
- Broadcast area: Jefferson County, New York
- Frequency: 93.3 MHz
- Branding: Z93

Programming
- Format: Classic hits

Ownership
- Owner: Stephens Media Group; (Stephens Media Group Watertown, LLC)
- Sister stations: WFRY-FM, WNER, WTNY

History
- First air date: 1986; 40 years ago
- Former call signs: WTNY-FM (1986–1997)
- Former frequencies: 97.5 MHz (1986–1997); 93.5 MHz (1997–1999)

Technical information
- Licensing authority: FCC
- Facility ID: 153
- Class: A
- ERP: 6,000 watts
- HAAT: 100 meters (330 ft)

Links
- Public license information: Public file; LMS
- Webcast: Listen Live
- Website: classichitsz93.com

WCIZ-FM (93.3 MHz) is a commercial radio station in Watertown, New York. It is owned by the Stephens Media Group and airs a classic hits radio format, which leans toward classic rock. Unlike some classic hits stations, WCIZ does not play pop or dance artists, such as Madonna, Michael Jackson or Gloria Estefan.

Around early 2000, the station changed formats from classic rock to classic hits. WCIZ-FM went on the air in the summer of 1988. The station originally began broadcasting at 97.5 FM, later moving to 93.5 in 1997. It changed to its current frequency at 93.3 FM on the week of November 6, 1998. With the frequency move came a tower move from a site north of Watertown to sharing a tower east of the city with sister station WFRY-FM 97.5. Prior to WCIZ-FM's move to 93.5 from 97.5, the station was a CHR station known as WTNY-FM "T-93 FM" which began broadcasting on April 30, 1986.
