= KEZP =

Radio station in Bunkie, Louisiana

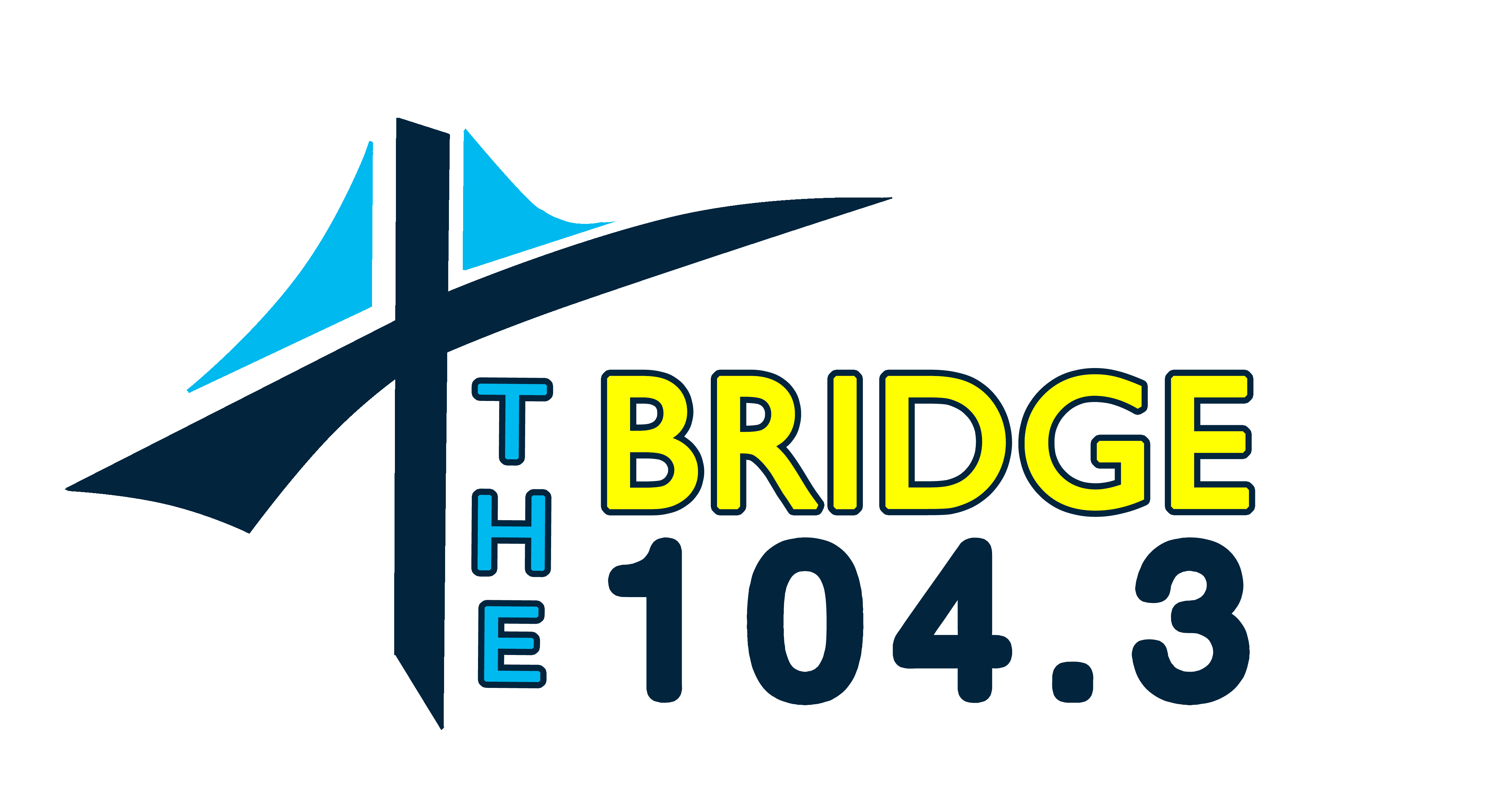
- Bunkie, Louisiana; United States
- Broadcast area: Greater Alexandria
- Frequency: 104.3 MHz
- Branding: 104.3 The Bridge

Programming
- Language: English
- Format: Christian adult contemporary

Ownership
- Owner: Globecomm Media LLC
- Sister stations: KLAA-FM; KBKK; KEDG

History
- First air date: 1989
- Former call signs: KRBG (1989–1991); KRBG-FM (1991)

Technical information
- Licensing authority: FCC
- Facility ID: 51078
- Class: C3
- ERP: 19,200 watts
- HAAT: 114 meters (374 ft)
- Transmitter coordinates: 31°5′14.00″N 92°21′34.00″W

Links
- Public license information: Public file; LMS
- Webcast: Listen live
- Website: 1043thebridge.com

KEZP (104.3 FM, "104.3 The Bridge") is an American radio station broadcasting a Christian AC format. The station is licensed to Bunkie, Louisiana, United States, and serves the Alexandria area. The station is currently owned by Globecomm Media LLC. Its studios are located in Alexandria, Louisiana and its transmitter is in Lecompte, Louisiana.

The station previously aired an oldies music format before moving to a classic hits format (as "104.3 The Tiger"), then to classic rock in 2005 and alternative rock (as "Red 104-3") on August 4, 2008.

KEZP dropped the alternative music format on January 17, 2011, in favor of a news/talk format, branded as "The Truth." KEZP had a brief stint as EZ Praise 104.3 after the death of their GM Kim Jones in February 2013. At midnight on June 21, EZ Praise turned into 104.3 The Bridge.

104.3 The Bridge features Dave and Katy in the morning and the syndicated Keep the Faith with Penny each evening.

In March 2025, it was announced that Stephens Media Group would be selling its four stations in the Alexandria area to Globecomm Media LLC for $350,000; the sale was completed in June 2025.
