= KMYY =

Radio station in Rayville, Louisiana

Coordinates: 32.484°N 91.903°W

- Rayville, Louisiana; United States
- Broadcast area: Monroe–West Monroe
- Frequency: 92.3 MHz
- Branding: The Ranch 92.3

Programming
- Language: English
- Format: Classic country
- Affiliations: Premiere Networks

Ownership
- Owner: Warrior Media LLC
- Sister stations: KNNW; KXRR; KZRZ

History
- First air date: September 1984 (as KTJC)
- Former call signs: KTJC (1984–2001); KQLQ (2001–March 2002); KXRR (March–September 2002)

Technical information
- Licensing authority: FCC
- Facility ID: 34016
- Class: C3
- ERP: 25,000 watts
- HAAT: 94.4 meters (310 ft)

Links
- Public license information: Public file; LMS
- Webcast: Listen live

KMYY (92.3 FM, "The Ranch") is a classic country music formatted radio station broadcasting in Monroe, Louisiana, United States,. It is owned by Warrior Media LLC. Its studios are located in Monroe, and its transmitter is located west of Rayville. The station carries the syndicated morning show The Bobby Bones Show.

In June 2025, it was announced that Stephen Media Group would be selling its Monroe stations to Warrior Media LLC for $450,000. The sale was completed in August 2025.

On September 8, 2025, KMYY changed its format from country to classic country, branded as "The Ranch 92.3".
