= WNER =

Radio station in Watertown, New York

- Watertown, New York; United States
- Frequency: 1410 kHz
- Branding: Fox Sports Radio 1410

Programming
- Format: Sports
- Affiliations: Fox Sports Radio

Ownership
- Owner: Stephens Media Group
- Sister stations: WCIZ-FM, WFRY-FM, WTNY

History
- First air date: November 2, 1959
- Former call signs: WOTT (1959–1988); WNCQ (1988–1996); WCIZ (1996–1997); WUZZ (1997–2000); WGME (2000–2001)
- Call sign meaning: "Winner"

Technical information
- Licensing authority: FCC
- Facility ID: 71093
- Class: D
- Power: 3,500 watts (day); 58 watts (night)
- Transmitter coordinates: 43°56′47.2″N 75°56′50.7″W
- Translator: 97.9 W250CI (Watertown)

Links
- Public license information: Public file; LMS
- Website: wner1410.com

WNER (1410 AM) is a sports radio station in Watertown, New York, United States. The station is owned by Stephens Media Group. It broadcasts the national programming of Fox Sports Radio.

== History ==
=== WOTT ===
On June 11, 1958, Thousand Islands Broadcasting Company applied to the Federal Communications Commission (FCC) to build a new radio station in Watertown which would broadcast during the daytime only with 5,000 watts. The application was approved on June 3, 1959, and the station began broadcasting on November 2 as WOTT from studios on State Street. Majority control was originally held by Frances M. Johnston, who gifted it to her son, James M. Johnston, in 1961. That year, Johnston purchased control of WRVM in Rochester; in order to pay down debt on that station, he sold WOTT in 1963 to CRS Enterprises, which in turn sold the business to RBG Productions in 1967 as its executive vice president moved to Pennsylvania. RBG then built WOTT-FM (97.5) in 1968; the station changed its call sign to WNCQ in 1970. The station was a Top 40 outlet until May 1977, when it switched to country music.

While RBG Productions filed for a construction permit to build a second television station in the Watertown area in 1978, WOTT–WNCQ's financial condition was deteriorating. RBG Productions owed the Internal Revenue Service more than $44,000 in back taxes, and its property was seized by the agency. The 1977 death of Daniel Bernheim had led to the appointment of his two children—L. Andrew Bernheim and Adelyn Firtel—as co-executors. In New Jersey courts, Firtel obtained orders giving her sole custody of the firm's voting stock; L. Andrew Bernheim had been jailed four times between June and November 1982 for contempt of court in New Jersey over a running dispute involving the management of various estate assets. Firtel was denied access to WOTT–WNCQ records by the station manager and his attorney, whom she then sued. By 1982, the station was in arrears to Niagara Mohawk Power Corporation, the local electric utility; United Press International; and on its music licensing fees. The Bernheim estate dispute continued to play out for years. In 1983, the parent company, Reach, McClinton and Co, Inc., filed for Chapter 11 bankruptcy as part of the family dispute, and it was not until 1987 that bankruptcy court approved a sale of the stations to William D. Goddard and Jeffrey Shapiro, who owned station WHDQ in Claremont, New Hampshire. L. Andrew Bernheim attempted to block the transaction without success.

=== WNCQ, WCIZ, WUZZ ===
On August 1, 1988, WOTT switched from an easy listening format to WNCQ with a country format, as the former WNCQ on FM flipped to rock under new WCIZ call letters. Rumblings of format changes had been swirling for months as the new owners sought to compete against the leading station in the area, contemporary hit outlet WTNY-FM (93.3).

In 1996, WNCQ and WCIZ were sold to Forever Broadcasting, by which time the AM station was airing an oldies format. The deal combined the pair with WTNY AM and FM and put WTNY-FM and WCIZ, the two top-rated stations in the North Country, under common ownership. As WNCQ-FM in Ogdensburg, New York, remained under the Goddard–Shapiro ownership, the AM station adopted the WCIZ call letters as well, though its format was not altered in a realignment of formats that took place at the start of 1997.

Even though WCIZ changed call letters to WUZZ in 1997, the oldies format was scrapped in October 1998 for R&B.

=== WNER ===
Regent Communications of Covington, Kentucky, acquired Forever's Watertown and Utica clusters for $44 million in 2000. Citing low listenership, Regent flipped WUZZ to sports at the end of 2000; after obtaining the WGME call letters for three weeks starting on December 14, the station launched as WNER with sports—originally ESPN Radio—programming in February 2001. Stephens Media Group purchased the Regent Watertown cluster in 2008.

== Translators ==
Broadcast translator for WNER
| Call sign | Frequency | City of license | FID | ERP (W) | Class | FCC info |
|---|---|---|---|---|---|---|
| W250CI | 97.9 FM | Watertown, New York | 199997 | 68 | D | LMS |
