= KWLZ =

Radio station in Shasta Lake, California

- Shasta Lake, California; United States
- Broadcast area: Redding–Red Bluff–Corning
- Frequency: 99.3 MHz
- Branding: Wild 99-3

Programming
- Format: Contemporary hit radio

Ownership
- Owner: Stephens Media Group; (SMG Redding, LLC)
- Sister stations: KNRO, KQMS, KRDG, KSHA

History
- First air date: October 24, 1989
- Former call signs: KCIB (1988–1989, CP); KNNN (1989–2010); KQMS-FM (2010–2017)
- Call sign meaning: Wild

Technical information
- Licensing authority: FCC
- Facility ID: 54039
- Class: C2
- Power: 1,600 watts
- HAAT: 465 meters (1,526 ft)
- Transmitter coordinates: 40°39′15″N 122°31′16″W

Links
- Public license information: Public file; LMS
- Webcast: Listen live
- Website: wild993fm.com

KWLZ (99.3 FM) is an commercial radio station licensed to Shasta Lake, California, United States, serving the Northern California area. The station is owned by Stephens Media Group.

== History ==
For over a decade, KNNN aired a CHR music format branded as "Mix 99.3". From its inception until the "Mix 99.3" brand was introduced, the station was known as "K-9 FM", and played a pop-based Adult Contemporary format. The original "K-9" AC format was the result of a listener voting process following a months-long format testing experiment, where a different format was played every hour of the day.

In January 2007, 99.3 flipped to country as "99.3 Hank FM."

On September 20, 2010, KNNN changed its call letters to KQMS-FM and changed its format to news/talk, simulcasting KQMS, as Hank FM and the KNNN calls moved to 87.7.

On January 15, 2017, 99.3 dropped the KQMS simulcast and began stunting with a loop of "Wild Thing" by Tone Lōc. On January 18, KQMS-FM launched a Top 40 format, branded as "Wild 99.3" under the new calls KWLZ, launching with 10,000 songs in a row. The first song was "Fake Love" by Drake.
