= KTSO =

Radio station in Sapulpa, Oklahoma

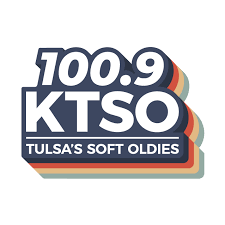
- Sapulpa, Oklahoma; United States
- Broadcast area: Tulsa metropolitan area
- Frequency: 100.9 MHz (HD Radio)
- Branding: 100.9 KTSO

Programming
- Format: Soft oldies
- Subchannels: HD2: Now 94.5 (Contemporary Christian)
- Affiliations: Compass Media Networks; United Stations Radio Networks

Ownership
- Owner: Stephens Media Group; (KXOJ, Inc.)
- Sister stations: KCFO; KMYZ-FM; KXOJ-FM; KYAL; KYAL-FM

History
- First air date: February 22, 1977
- Former call signs: KXOJ-FM (1977–2016)
- Call sign meaning: "Tulsa's Soft Oldies"

Technical information
- Licensing authority: FCC
- Facility ID: 35976
- Class: C3
- ERP: 19,000 watts
- HAAT: 114 meters (374 ft)
- Transmitter coordinates: 35°58′02″N 96°02′15″W
- Translator: HD2: 94.5 K233AU (Tulsa)

Links
- Public license information: Public file; LMS
- Webcast: Listen live HD2: Listen live
- Website: ktso.com now945.com (HD2)

KTSO (100.9 FM) is a commercial radio station licensed to Sapulpa, Oklahoma, United States, and serving the Tulsa metropolitan area. It is part of the Stephens Media Group, and it airs a soft oldies format. The studios are on the 57th floor in the CityPlex Towers on East 81st Street in South Tulsa.

KTSO has an effective radiated power (ERP) of 19,000 watts. The transmitter is off West 136 Street South in Sapulpa. KTSO broadcasts using HD Radio technology. Its HD-2 digital subchannel carries a Contemporary Christian format, which feeds an FM translator at 94.5 MHz, K233AU.

== History ==
=== KXOJ-FM ===
The station signed on the air on February 22, 1977. Its original call sign was KXOJ-FM. It was the sister station to KXOJ 1550 AM. They were owned by KXOJ, Inc. The AM station had a full service format of middle of the road music, with local news and sports. KXOJ-FM aired a Christian radio format. It was only powered at 2,000 watts, a fraction of its current output and only audible in and around Sapulpa.

A new tower was constructed for the station in 2014. It is between Glenpool and Sapulpa, near U.S. Route 75. The tower was part of an FCC granted Class C3 upgrade, increasing the station to an ERP of 19,000 watts. The transmission also includes an HD signal that covers the Tulsa metro area.

Previously, KXOJ operated from a 361-foot tower near Sapulpa, operating at only 5,000 watts. Several inner-ring Tulsa suburbs such as Broken Arrow, Claremore and Okmulgee only got a grade B signal.

Over time, the Christian talk and teaching shows were cut back, making KXOJ-FM a full time Christian Contemporary outlet. Every morning between 6 and 10am KXOJ-FM's on-air lineup included Dave Weston and Katie Rindt. Other veteran announcers included Bob Michaels, who joined the station in 1998, and Gary Thompson 3pm to 7pm, who began intermittently working there in the early 1990s. After many years in morning drive, Heather Miles moved to the 10a to 3p shift in January 2016.

Despite the signal limitations, KXOJ-FM won three Dove Awards as Station of the Year.

=== KTSO ===
In 2013, Stephens Media Group purchased the original KTSO at 100.9 FM. Starting on August 16, 2016 at 7:30, the KXOJ-FM call sign and format moved to 94.1 FM after 39 years of broadcasting at 100.9 FM. The move allowed KXOJ to move to KTSO's more powerful tower in west Tulsa, broadcasting at a full 100,000 watts. 100.9 FM changed call letters to KTSO and began airing a recorded announcement redirecting listeners to 94.1 FM.

On August 31, 2016, at 9 a.m., KTSO began stunting with all Tulsa-related songs. At 11 a.m., the stunt shifted to a loop of The Gap Band's "You Dropped a Bomb on Me". At noon, KTSO flipped to All-80s Hits as "Totally Awesome 80's 100.9." It promised to play 1,980 songs commercial free. The first title under the format was "We Are The World" by USA for Africa.

On October 20, 2020, at 3 p.m., the “Totally Awesome 80s” format moved to translator 94.5 K233AU, which rebroadcasts KTSO's HD-2 sub-channel. At the same time, KTSO flipped to “Tulsa’s Soft Oldies”, focusing on music from the 1970s through the 1990s. The first song under the format was "Reminiscing" by the Little River Band.

In November 2022, KTSO switched to Christmas music for the holiday season. That marked the return of the All-Christmas format on Tulsa radio since KTGX-HD2 began stunting as "Christmas 93.5" in 2018. In November 2023, KTSO again flipped to all holiday songs, leading up to Christmas Day.

== HD Programming ==
KTSO is licensed by the FCC to broadcast in the HD Radio hybrid format.

The HD2 subchannel simulcasts on translator K233AU (94.5 FM) in Tulsa, and broadcast the former '80s Hits format that was on the main signal. It was branded as "Totally Awesome 80's".

On February 22, 2022, KTSO-HD2 and translator 94.5 K233AU returned to Contemporary Christian music. It uses the moniker "NOW 94.5".

== Translator ==
Broadcast translator for KTSO-HD2
Call sign	Frequency	City of license	FID	ERP (W)	HAAT	Class	FCC info
K233AU	94.5 FM	Tulsa, Oklahoma	140310	250	191.6 m (629 ft)	D	LMS
