= KNNW =

Radio station in Columbia, Louisiana

Coordinates: 32.196°N 92.163°W

- Columbia, Louisiana; United States
- Broadcast area: Monroe–West Monroe
- Frequency: 103.1 MHz
- Branding: 103 Rocks

Programming
- Language: English
- Format: Active rock
- Affiliations: Compass Media Networks; Premiere Networks

Ownership
- Owner: Warrior Media LLC
- Sister stations: KMYY; KXRR; KZRZ

History
- First air date: February 25, 1980 (as KCTO-FM)
- Former call signs: KCTO-FM (1980–1999); KYEA (1999–2001); KXRR (2001–2002); KQLQ (2002–2014)
- Call sign meaning: K N NoW (previous format)

Technical information
- Licensing authority: FCC
- Facility ID: 67283
- Class: C3
- ERP: 25,000 watts
- HAAT: 100 meters (330 ft)

Links
- Public license information: Public file; LMS

KNNW (103.1 FM, "103 Rocks") is an active rock radio station licensed to Columbia, Louisiana and serving the Greater Monroe area. It is owned by Warrior Media LLC. The transmitter tower is located in Patterson Dr. in Columbia and studio is located in Monroe.

== History ==
Logo as "Now FM", used from 2014 to 2024

KQLQ was originally a rhythmic, billed as "103.1 The Party", until November 2009, when it changed to Top 40/CHR as "Hot 103.1". On September 16, 2014, KQLQ began stunting with songs with the word "now" in their name (i.e. All Right Now, Who Can It Be Now?, Right Now, etc.), while running liners asking "is it now yet?" and to listen the next day at noon. At that time KQLQ rebranded as 103.1 Now FM. The first song on Now FM was "Maps" by Maroon 5. On October 29, 2014, KQLQ changed their call letters to KNNW, to go with the "Now FM" branding.

In June 2025, it was announced that Stephen Media Group would be selling its Monroe stations to Warrior Media LLC for $450,000. The sale was completed in August 2025.

On August 31, 2025, KNNW changed their format from top 40/CHR to active rock, branded as "103 Rocks".
