= KALF =

Radio station in Red Bluff, California

Coordinates: 39.917°N 122.671°W

- Red Bluff, California; United States
- Broadcast area: Chico–Red Bluff
- Frequency: 95.7 MHz
- Branding: New Country 95-7 The Wolf

Programming
- Format: Country

Ownership
- Owner: Stephens Media Group; (SMG-Redding, LLC)

History
- First air date: 1978

Technical information
- Licensing authority: FCC
- Facility ID: 40919
- Class: B
- ERP: 7,000 watts
- HAAT: 386 meters

Links
- Public license information: Public file; LMS
- Webcast: Listen Live
- Website: 957thewolfonline.com

KALF is a commercial radio station licensed to Red Bluff, California, and located in Chico, California, broadcasting to Butte, Shasta, Tehama, and Glenn Counties on 95.7 FM. KALF airs a country music format branded as "New Country 95-7 The Wolf".
