= KXRR =

Radio station in Monroe, Louisiana

Coordinates: 32.660°N 92.088°W

KMJZ
- Monroe, Louisiana; United States
- Broadcast area: Monroe–Richwood LA
- Frequency: 106.1 MHz
- Branding: Magic 106.1 Monroe’s R&B and Throwback Station

Programming
- Language: English
- Format: Urban adult contemporary

Ownership
- Owner: Warrior Media LLC
- Sister stations: KMYY; KXRR; KZRZ

History
- First air date: January 28, 1966
- Former call signs: KREB (1965–1979); KNAN (1979–1991); KMGC (1991–1993); KMYY (1993–2002)

Technical information
- Licensing authority: FCC
- Facility ID: 50405
- Class: C0
- ERP: 100,000 watts
- HAAT: 310 meters (1,020 ft)

Links
- Public license information: Public file; LMS
- Website: magic1061.com

KMJZ (106.1 FM, "Magic 106.1") is an urban adult contemporary-formatted radio station in Monroe, Louisiana, United States. It is owned by Warrior Media LLC. Studios are located in Monroe, and its transmitter is located near Sterlington, Louisiana.

== History ==
Monroe Broadcasters, Inc., filed with the Federal Communications Commission (FCC) to build a new FM radio station in Monroe on November 24, 1964. The FCC granted approval for the station on June 29, 1965, and KREB began broadcasting on January 28, 1966. Two months later, the station set its format as country music. The fledgling station was sold less than two years later to Twin City Broadcasters, which was owned by Jimmy L. and Lehlia H. Terry, in exchange for assumption of liabilities.

In 1979, KREB was sold by the Terrys to Hope Communications, owned by Monroe auto parts dealer Roger D. Pinton. The call sign was changed to KNAN on August 13 of that year; the designation was intended to be pronounced "Canaan" as part of a new gospel music format. However, the station switched to adult contemporary in the early 1980s and then adopted a satellite-fed AC format in 1983, a decision the program director credited for improving KNAN's sound because they had more control over the patter of the satellite DJs than they did of the station's previous "18- and 20-year-old jocks". Hope owned KNAN through 1986, when it was sold to Live Oak Broadcasting, owned by the Love family of Biloxi, Mississippi, for $1.76 million. By the time the sale had been made, KNAN was already putting in motion a shift from adult contemporary to contemporary hit radio.

Love Broadcasting exited radio by selling its five stations—an AM and FM in Savannah, Georgia, an AM and FM in Jackson, Mississippi, and KNAN—to Opus Communications in late 1989. Opus changed the call letters to KMGC in 1991, reflecting the "Magic 106" moniker the station used; in 1993, KMGC flipped to country as KMYY. In 1995, Radioactive Images, a company with ties to KCTO-FM 103.1 in nearby Columbia, Louisiana, purchased KMYY from Opus; the deal faced some opposition from a rival station owner who alleged that the owner of Radioactive, who doubled as the general manager of local KYEA (98.3 FM), failed to file equal employment opportunity reports for that station and from a woman who alleged that her ex-husband, a KCTO-FM disc jockey, encouraged listeners to call her workplace and ask for sexual favors, leading to her termination. Broadcasting Partners Holdings acquired KMYY, KCTO, and KYEA from their owners in 1997. While Broadcasting Partners was purchased by Citadel Broadcasting in 1999 for $190 million, it divested the Monroe cluster in December 2000 coinciding with its purchase of five radio stations in Tucson, Arizona, as the firm sought to trade smaller markets for larger ones.

On September 9, 2002, a shuffle of formats was carried out by Monroe Radio Partners. Rock-formatted KXRR, which had already existed at 103.1, moved from 92.3 MHz to 106.1. KMYY was shifted from country to classic country and moved to 92.3, which had been KXRR. The move was read as pulling the 106.1 frequency out of regional competition with the entrenched KJLO, in the same format. Opus Media Partners (of no relation to Opus Communications), owned by Richard Linhart, purchased the Monroe cluster from Monroe Radio Partners in 2004 for $6.5 million.

Mapleton Communications purchased Opus's Louisiana stations in Monroe and Alexandria, including KXRR, in a $2.2 million transaction in 2014. Nearly all of Mapleton was purchased by Stephens Media Group in 2019.

In June 2025, it was announced that Stephen Media Group would be selling its Monroe stations to Warrior Media LLC for $450,000. The sale was completed in August 2025.

On August 31, 2025, KXRR changed their format from mainstream rock to urban adult contemporary, branded as (KMJZ)"Magic 106.1".
