= KLAA-FM =

Radio station in Tioga, Louisiana

- Tioga, Louisiana; United States
- Broadcast area: Alexandria-Pineville
- Frequency: 103.5 MHz
- Branding: LA 103.5

Programming
- Language: English
- Format: Country
- Affiliations: Compass Media Networks

Ownership
- Owner: Globecomm Media LLC
- Sister stations: KBKK; KEDG; KEZP

History
- First air date: May 25, 1984
- Former call signs: KISY (1984–1990); KLAA (1990–2006)
- Call sign meaning: Louisiana

Technical information
- Licensing authority: FCC
- Facility ID: 8166
- Class: C2
- ERP: 50,000 watts
- HAAT: 145 meters (476 ft)
- Transmitter coordinates: 31.428°N 92.405°W

Links
- Public license information: Public file; LMS
- Webcast: Listen Live
- Website: www.la103.com

KLAA-FM (103.5 MHz, "LA 103.5") is an American country music radio station broadcasting in the Alexandria metropolitan area. The station is licensed to Tioga, Louisiana, United States, which is located northeast of Alexandria in Rapides Parish. It is branded as Louisiana's 10 In A Row Country with the slogan of "LA 103.5" and is owned by Globecomm Media LLC. Its studios are located in Pineville and its transmitter is in Ball, Louisiana.

In March 2025, it was announced that Stephens Media Group would be selling its four stations in the Alexandria area to Globecomm Media LLC for $350,000; the sale was completed in June 2025.
