= KCMX-FM =

Radio station in Ashland, Oregon

- Ashland, Oregon; United States
- Broadcast area: Medford–Ashland, Oregon
- Frequency: 101.9 MHz
- Branding: Lite 102

Programming
- Format: Adult contemporary
- Affiliations: Compass Media Networks; Premiere Networks

Ownership
- Owner: Stephens Media Group; (SMG-Medford, LLC)
- Sister stations: KAKT, KBOY-FM, KTMT, KTMT-FM

History
- First air date: July 20, 1978 (as KKIC at 101.7)
- Former call signs: KKIC (1978–1981)
- Former frequencies: 101.7 MHz (1978–1981)

Technical information
- Licensing authority: FCC
- Facility ID: 57434
- Class: C
- ERP: 42,000 watts
- HAAT: 448 meters (1,470 ft)
- Transmitter coordinates: 42°17′55″N 122°44′53″W
- Translator: 107.1 K296DA (Grants Pass)

Links
- Public license information: Public file; LMS
- Webcast: Listen Live
- Website: lite102.com

KCMX-FM (101.9 MHz) is a radio station broadcasting an adult contemporary music format. Licensed to Ashland, Oregon, United States, the station serves the Medford-Ashland area. The station is currently owned by Stephens Media Group, through licensee SMG-Medford, LLC.

== Translators ==
KCMX-FM broadcasts on the following translator:

Broadcast translator for KCMX-FM
Call sign	Frequency	City of license	FID	ERP (W)	Class	FCC info
K296DA	107.1 FM	Grants Pass, Oregon	179	45	D	LMS

== Previous logo ==
(KCMX-FM's logo under previous "Lite 102" branding)
