= KYAL-FM =

Radio station in Muskogee, Oklahoma

- Muskogee, Oklahoma; United States
- Broadcast area: Tulsa metropolitan area
- Frequency: 97.1 MHz
- Branding: The Sports Animal

Programming
- Format: Sports
- Affiliations: ESPN Radio

Ownership
- Owner: Stephens Media Group; (KMMY Inc.)
- Sister stations: KCFO; KTSO; KXOJ-FM; KYAL

History
- First air date: January 19, 1984
- Former call signs: KRLQ (1984–1990); KKWK (1988–1991); KMMY (1991–2006)

Technical information
- Licensing authority: FCC
- Facility ID: 35141
- Class: C
- ERP: 100,000 watts
- HAAT: 600 meters (2,000 ft)
- Transmitter coordinates: 35°24′48.4″N 95°21′55.9″W
- Repeaters: 96.1 KITO-FM (Vinita, Oklahoma); 101.1 KEOJ (Caney, Kansas)

Links
- Public license information: Public file; LMS
- Webcast: Listen live
- Website: sportsanimalradio.com

KYAL-FM (97.1 FM, "The Sports Animal") is a commercial radio station licensed to Muskogee, Oklahoma, and serving the Tulsa metropolitan area. It is owned by Stephens Media Group, and it simulcasts a sports radio format with sister station KYAL 1550 AM. The stations have Oklahoma-based sports shows on weekdays and they air the syndicated The Paul Finebaum Show in the evening. Nights and weekends, KYAL-AM-FM carry ESPN Radio. The studios are at the CityPlex Towers in South Tulsa.

KYAL-FM has an effective radiated power (ERP) of 100,000 watts, the maximum for most FM stations in the U.S. The transmitter tower is off East 1110 Road in the Shady Grove area of Muskogee.

== History ==
The station signed on the air on January 19, 1984. The original call sign was KRLQ. Later, as KKWK, the station was known as "Quick 97". In 1987, it began airing the syndicated weekend countdown show, American Top 40.

As KMMY, this station was known as "Y97, Today's Hot New Country" and aired a country music format. Notable on-air personalities included disk jockey Gary Walker and weather forecaster Don Woods.

The station was assigned the KYAL-FM call letters by the Federal Communications Commission on April 3, 2006. The station flipped from country music to all-sports on April 17, 2006, when the "Sports Animal" format, previously heard on 1550 KYAL only, began to simulcast on sister station KYAL-FM. The AM station and KBIX simulcast this programming as part of the Sports Animal Network. The station made the change to increase the coverage area and improve the signal as part of a drive to improve ratings.
