= KTMT-FM =

Radio station in Medford, Oregon

- Medford, Oregon; United States
- Broadcast area: Medford–Ashland, Oregon
- Frequency: 93.7 MHz (HD Radio)
- Branding: Joy! 93.7

Programming
- Format: Contemporary Christian
- Subchannels: HD2: Top 40 (CHR) "Hits 93.3"

Ownership
- Owner: Stephens Media Group; (SMG-Medford, LLC)
- Sister stations: KAKT, KBOY-FM, KCMX-FM, KTMT

History
- First air date: October 15, 1970 (as KMED-FM)
- Former call signs: KMED-FM (1970–1972)

Technical information
- Licensing authority: FCC
- Facility ID: 60313
- Class: C
- ERP: 31,000 watts
- HAAT: 980 meters (3,220 ft)
- Transmitter coordinates: 42°4′52″N 122°43′9″W
- Translator: See § Translators

Links
- Public license information: Public file; LMS
- Webcast: Listen Live; HD2: Listen Live
- Website: joy937fm.com hits933.com (HD2)

KTMT-FM (93.7 MHz, "Joy! 93.7") is a commercial Christian contemporary music radio station in Medford, Oregon, United States, broadcasting to the Medford–Ashland, Oregon area. The station is currently owned by Stephens Media Group.

== History ==
KTMT-FM in the 1970s had a beautiful music format. Beginning in the 1980s, the station had a Top 40/CHR format known as "Stereo 93", later known as “Power 93 KTMT” and then “Beat 93” from 1996 until 2005.

On April 1, 2005, KTMT-FM dropped its longtime Top 40 format to jump on the adult hits bandwagon as "93.7 Mike FM".

In early 2009, the station changed to Adult Top 40 as “Mix 93” and had a contest in which listeners competed to design the station’s new logo.

On March 25, 2011, KTMT-FM began stunting with a series of heartbeats. On March 29, 2011, the station returned to its former Top 40 format as "Beat 93.7".

On March 31, 2012, KTMT-FM rebranded as "Now 93.7" and later "93.7 Now FM".

On July 14, 2021, at 12 noon, 5 days after launching "Hits 93.3" on translator K227AA and KCMX-HD3, KTMT-FM became "Joy! 93.7" with a Christian contemporary music format.

== Translators ==
KTMT-FM broadcasts on the following translators:

Broadcast translators for KTMT-FM
Call sign	Frequency	City of license	FID	ERP (W)	Class	FCC info
K221CP	92.1 FM	Grants Pass, Oregon	60310	200	D	LMS
K265AF	100.9 FM	Happy Camp, California	60600	60	D	LMS

Broadcast translator for KTMT-HD2
Call sign	Frequency	City of license	FID	ERP (W)	Class	FCC info
K227AA	93.3 FM	Ashland, Oregon	60311	250	D	LMS

== Previous logo ==
(KTMT-FM's logo under previous "Mix 93" format)
