= KMYZ-FM =

Radio station in Pryor, Oklahoma

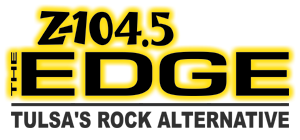
- Pryor, Oklahoma; United States
- Broadcast area: Tulsa metropolitan area
- Frequency: 104.5 MHz
- Branding: Z-104.5 The Edge

Programming
- Format: Alternative rock
- Affiliations: Compass Media Networks

Ownership
- Owner: Stephens Media Group; (SMG-Tulsa, LLC)
- Sister stations: KCFO; KTSO; KXOJ-FM; KYAL-FM

History
- First air date: July 3, 1969
- Former call signs: KKMA (1969–1981)

Technical information
- Licensing authority: FCC
- Facility ID: 59979
- Class: C1
- ERP: 70,000 watts
- HAAT: 344 meters (1,129 ft)
- Transmitter coordinates: 36°01′10″N 95°39′24″W

Links
- Public license information: Public file; LMS
- Webcast: Listen live
- Website: edgetulsa.com

KMYZ-FM (104.5 MHz, "Z104.5 The Edge") is a commercial radio station licensed to Pryor, Oklahoma and serving the Tulsa metropolitan area, airing an alternative rock format. It is owned by the Stephens Media Group with studios at the CityPlex Towers on East 81st Street in South Tulsa.

KMYZ-FM has an effective radiated power (ERP) of 70,000 watts. The transmitter tower is in Coweta, near the Muskogee Turnpike.

== History ==
The station signed on the air on July 3, 1969. Its original call sign was KKMA, sister station to KOLS 1570 AM (now KTUZ). KKMA was an automated country music station in its early years.

In the late '70s, the country format was dropped for album rock. KMYZ's studios moved to Tulsa in the early 1980s. In 1984, KMYZ sold to Shamrock Communications (a division of Times-Shamrock Communications) for $1.51 million and its format evolved to classic rock by 1985. It later changed to CHR/Adult Top-40 as "Z-104.5". The station started leaning towards a rock direction in its CHR format beating then crosstown CHR rival KAYI (now KHTT).

KMYZ-FM later evolved into a mainstream rock sound to compete against rival rock station 97.5 KMOD-FM. On February 27, 1995, the station changed to a Modern rock/alternative format as "Z-104.5 The Edge" which still airs to this day. On average The Edge hosts two to three annual concerts a year for Christmas and the station's birthday. Past performers have included The 1975, Death Cab For Cutie, Phoenix, Weezer, The Smashing Pumpkins, Cage The Elephant, Garbage and Young The Giant.

On April 25, 2013, it was announced that Stephens Media Group would acquire KMYZ and KTSO from Times-Shamrock; the sale was completed in October for $8.5 million.
