= KTMT (AM) =

Radio station in Ashland, Oregon

- Ashland, Oregon; United States
- Broadcast area: Medford–Ashland, Oregon
- Frequency: 580 kHz
- Branding: The Game 96.1 and 580

Programming
- Format: Sports
- Affiliations: Westwood One Sports

Ownership
- Owner: Stephens Media Group; (SMG-Medford, LLC)
- Sister stations: KAKT, KBOY-FM, KCMX-FM, KTMT-FM

History
- First air date: 1946 (as KWIN at 1400)
- Former call signs: KWIN (1946–1971); KCMX (1971–1999); KTMT (1999–2008); KGAY (2008–2010)
- Former frequencies: 1400 kHz (1946–1962)

Technical information
- Licensing authority: FCC
- Facility ID: 57733
- Class: B
- Power: 1,000 watts
- Transmitter coordinates: 42°9′51″N 122°38′52″W
- Translator: 96.1 K241CA (Ashland)

Links
- Public license information: Public file; LMS
- Webcast: Listen Live
- Website: thegame541.com

KTMT (580 kHz) is an AM radio station broadcasting a sports format. Licensed to Ashland, Oregon, the station serves the greater Medford–Ashland area. The station, originally established in 1946, is currently owned by Stephens Media Group, through licensee SMG-Medford, LLC.

== History ==
The station was launched in 1946 as KWIN on a frequency of 1400 kHz, broadcasting with 250 watts of power. In 1962, the station shifted to the 580 kHz frequency and upgraded to 1,000 watts of broadcast power. In 1972, the station changed its callsign to KCMX. On January 1, 1999, the station changed its call sign to KTMT. On January 31, 2008, the station changed its call sign to KGAY, and had a Regional Mexican format. On August 19, 2010, the station changed its call sign back to KTMT. On October 4, 2010 KTMT changed their format back to sports and is the home of CBS Sports Radio for the area.

=== High school coverage with KDRV 12+ ===
In September 2011, KTMT and Radio Medford started a working relationship with KDRV NewsWatch 12+ (Channel 12.2 over-the-air and channel 291 on Charter Cable in the Rogue Valley) with simulcast coverage of the "Friday Night Blitz Game Of The Week" during the high school football season and the "Roundball Wrap Game Of The Week" during the high school basketball season. Radio Medford's Bill Jacobs is joined by KDRV's Chris Leone and Brandon Kamerman. (Chris Breece was a part of the broadcast team from 2011 to 2012.)

Various Southern Oregon high schools are covered. However, games involving such high schools as North Medford High School, South Medford High School, Ashland High School, Crater High School and Cascade Christian High School are not broadcast on KTMT due to those schools' commitments with other radio stations.

== Translator ==
KTMT also broadcasts on the following FM translator:

Broadcast translator for KTMT
Call sign	Frequency	City of license	FID	ERP (W)	Class	FCC info
K241CA	96.1 FM	Ashland, Oregon	138438	100	D	LMS
