= KBKK =

Radio station in Ball, Louisiana

- Ball, Louisiana; United States
- Broadcast area: Greater Alexandria
- Frequency: 105.5 MHz
- Branding: 105.5 The Fox

Programming
- Language: English
- Format: Classic rock
- Affiliations: CNN Radio; Motor Racing Network

Ownership
- Owner: Globecomm Media LLC
- Sister stations: KLAA-FM; KEZP; KEDG

History
- First air date: June 1, 1998
- Former call signs: KBFU (1998–1998); KHFX (1998–2005)

Technical information
- Licensing authority: FCC
- Facility ID: 86913
- Class: A
- ERP: 6,000 watts
- HAAT: 97 meters (318 ft)
- Transmitter coordinates: 31°25′39.00″N 92°24′18.00″W

Links
- Public license information: Public file; LMS
- Webcast: Listen Live
- Website: KBKK Online

KBKK (105.5 FM) is an American radio station broadcasting a classic rock format. Licensed to Ball, Louisiana, United States, the station serves the Alexandria area. The station is currently owned by Globecomm Media LLC, and features programming from CNN Radio. Its studios are located in Pineville and its transmitter is in Ball, Louisiana.

== History ==
The station was assigned the call letters KBFU on June 1, 1998. On July 17, 1998, the station changed its call sign to KHFX, and on February 3, 2005 to the current KBKK. The station changed its format in December 2004 from the 1970s format to a classic country format.

In March 2025, it was announced that Stephens Media Group would be selling its four stations in the Alexandria area to Globecomm Media LLC for $350,000; the sale was completed in June 2025.

On June 2, 2025, KBKK changed their format from classic country to classic rock, branded as "105.5 The Fox".
