= Sperry, Oklahoma =

- Town
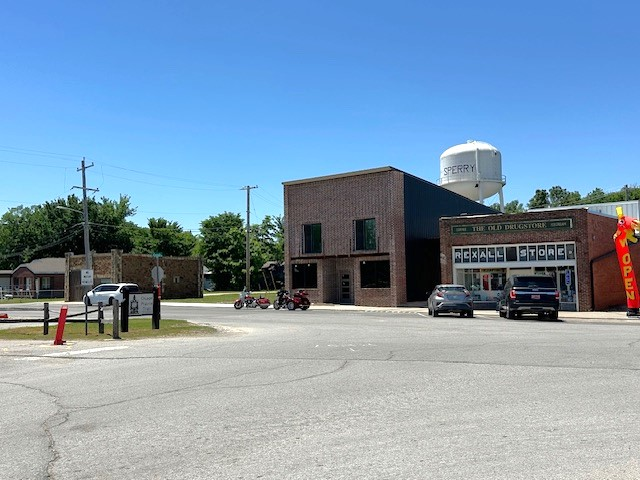
- Downtown Sperry & Water Tower in May 2025
- Nickname: Sperry, America
- Location of within Tulsa County, and the state of Oklahoma
- Coordinates: 36°17′43″N 95°59′24″W
- Country: United States
- State: Oklahoma
- County: Tulsa

Government

Area
  - Total: 1.81 sq mi (4.70 km^{2})
  - Land: 1.77 sq mi (4.59 km^{2})
  - Water: 0.042 sq mi (0.11 km^{2})
- Elevation: 620 ft (190 m)

Population (2020)
  - Total: 1,115
  - Density: 629.5/sq mi (243.04/km^{2})
- Time zone: UTC-6 (Central (CST))
  - Summer (DST): UTC-5 (CDT)
- ZIP code: 74073
- Area codes: 539/918
- FIPS code: 40-69300
- GNIS feature ID: 1098359
- Website: sperryok.gov

Sperry is a town in Tulsa County, Oklahoma, United States. The population was 1,115 at the time of the 2020 census. It is primarily a bedroom community, since approximately 85 percent of the employed residents commute to work in Tulsa and other nearby towns. Sperry also has an active retirement community.

== History ==
Native American activity in the area antedates the establishment of the town. Of note during the Civil War was the Battle of Chusto-Talasah, fought approximately nine miles southeast on the “Caving Banks” bend of Bird Creek, where on December 9, 1861, Opothleyahola’s Union-allied Native Americans met the forces of Col. D.H. Cooper’s Confederate troops.

Sperry was originally known as Beuhler Switch. It was named after Charles Beuhler, an employee of the Midland Valley Railroad. The Sperry post office in the Cherokee Nation was established on May 17, 1902, to serve a rural community between Hominy and Delaware Creeks. The post office was located in the Carson Ranch house. The origin of the name Sperry is not clear. One source claims that the name was derived from the surname of a local landowner named Henry Spybuck. The Midland Valley Railroad built a line from Arkansas to Eastern Kansas that reached Sperry in March 1905. The route no longer exists, but has been converted from rail into the 14.5 mile Osage Prairie Trail linking Sperry with Tulsa to the south and Skiatook to the north.

Exploration for oil brought prosperity between 1905 and 1910. Sperry incorporated in 1920, when the census recorded a population of 487. Two communities joined to form present-day Sperry. One was previously known as "Buehler Switch." This was the larger community, the location of the railroad and depot, and centered around 96th Street North and S. H. 11. The smaller community, consisting of only two or three homes and a general store/post office housed in the same building, was actually known as Sperry. It was on Hominy Creek. near 106th Street North and North Peoria. When statehood was granted in 1907, the post office was renamed Sperry and was moved from the general store to a new grocery store near the depot.

From 1982 to 1989, the Sperry WPA armory served as headquarters to the newly organized Oklahoma Army National Guard 45th Special Operations Aviation Regiment. The "Lords of Darkness" specialized in operating the OH-6 Little Bird helicopter while using night vision goggles. Aircraft were kept a short distance from the Tulsa Air National Guard Base. The unit evolved into the 1-245th Aviation Regiment, now housed at the Tulsa Army National Guard Aviation Complex near 46th St N and Highway 169 which was built 1988.

== Geography ==
Sperry is located at 36°17′43″N 95°59′24″W (36.295241, -95.989898). It is approximately 10 miles (16 km) north of downtown Tulsa.

According to the United States Census Bureau, the town has a total area of 0.9 square miles (2.3 km^{2}), all land.

== Demographics ==
Historical population
| Census | Pop. | Note | %± |
|---|---|---|---|
| 1920 | 487 | | — |
| 1930 | 563 | | 15.6% |
| 1940 | 570 | | 1.2% |
| 1950 | 665 | | 16.7% |
| 1960 | 883 | | 32.8% |
| 1970 | 1,123 | | 27.2% |
| 1980 | 1,276 | | 13.6% |
| 1990 | 937 | | −26.6% |
| 2000 | 1,351 | | 44.2% |
| 2010 | 1,205 | | −10.8% |
| 2020 | 1,115 | | −7.5% |
U.S. Decennial Census

=== 2020 census ===
Sperry High School in September 2026

As of the 2020 census, Sperry had a population of 1,115. The median age was 36.9 years. 25.3% of residents were under the age of 18 and 17.1% of residents were 65 years of age or older. For every 100 females there were 105.0 males, and for every 100 females age 18 and over there were 99.8 males age 18 and over.

0.0% of residents lived in urban areas, while 100.0% lived in rural areas.

There were 449 households in Sperry, of which 37.4% had children under the age of 18 living in them. Of all households, 39.6% were married-couple households, 23.4% were households with a male householder and no spouse or partner present, and 29.0% were households with a female householder and no spouse or partner present. About 28.0% of all households were made up of individuals and 14.3% had someone living alone who was 65 years of age or older.

There were 517 housing units, of which 13.2% were vacant. The homeowner vacancy rate was 2.0% and the rental vacancy rate was 8.8%.

Racial composition as of the 2020 census
| Race | Number | Percent |
|---|---|---|
| White | 756 | 67.8% |
| Black or African American | 7 | 0.6% |
| American Indian and Alaska Native | 183 | 16.4% |
| Asian | 4 | 0.4% |
| Native Hawaiian and Other Pacific Islander | 2 | 0.2% |
| Some other race | 12 | 1.1% |
| Two or more races | 151 | 13.5% |
| Hispanic or Latino (of any race) | 29 | 2.6% |

=== 2000 census ===
As of the census of 2000, there were 1,351 people, 375 households, and 78 families residing in the town. The population density was 1,118.3 inhabitants per square mile (431.8/km^{2}). There were 406 housing units at an average density of 462.8 per square mile (178.7/km^{2}). The racial makeup of the town was 70.64% White, 0.51% African American, 18.86% Native American, 0.10% Asian, 1.94% from other races, and 7.95% from two or more races. Hispanic or Latino of any race were 2.75% of the population.

There were 375 households, out of which 36.8% had children under the age of 18 living with them, 49.1% were married couples living together, 17.6% had a female householder with no husband present, and 28.3% were non-families. 25.3% of all households were made up of individuals, and 13.3% had someone living alone who was 65 years of age or older. The average household size was 2.60 and the average family size was 3.14.

In the town, the population was spread out, with 30.7% under the age of 18, 9.5% from 18 to 24, 25.2% from 25 to 44, 21.5% from 45 to 64, and 13.1% who were 65 years of age or older. The median age was 34 years. For every 100 females, there were 92.0 males. For every 100 females age 18 and over, there were 86.3 males.

The median income for a household in the town was $26,713, and the median income for a family was $30,192. Males had a median income of $26,167 versus $18,542 for females. The per capita income for the town was $11,767. About 15.1% of families and 89.2% of the population were below the poverty line, including 26.9% of those under age 18 and 12.9% of those age 65 or over.

Sperry Schools Field House, as seen in September of 2026

== Education ==
Sperry Public Schools is an independent school district in Sperry, Oklahoma serving grades K-12. The Elementary, Middle, and High School buildings share a campus on the western edge of Sperry.
