= KYAL (AM) =

Radio station in Sapulpa, Oklahoma

Coordinates: 36°01′08″N 96°05′55″W

Simulcast of KYAL-FM Muskogee
- Sapulpa, Oklahoma; United States
- Broadcast area: Tulsa metropolitan area
- Frequency: 1550 kHz
- Branding: The Sports Animal

Programming
- Format: Sports
- Affiliations: ESPN Radio

Ownership
- Owner: Stephens Media Group; (KXOJ, Inc.)
- Sister stations: KCFO; KTSO; KXOJ-FM; KYAL-FM

History
- First air date: June 15, 1962
- Former call signs: KXOJ (1962–198?, 1991–2002); KBLK (198?–1991)

Technical information
- Licensing authority: FCC
- Facility ID: 35974
- Class: D
- Power: 2,500 watts (days); 40 watts (nights)
- Translator: K260CR 99.9 (Sapulpa)

Links
- Public license information: Public file; LMS
- Webcast: Listen live
- Website: sportsanimalradio.com

KYAL (1550 AM) is a commercial radio station licensed to Sapulpa, Oklahoma, and serving the Tulsa metropolitan area. It is owned by Stephens Media Group and it simulcasts a sports radio format with sister station 97.1 KYAL-FM. The stations have Oklahoma-based sports shows on weekdays and they air the syndicated The Paul Finebaum Show in the evening. Nights and weekends, KYAL-AM-FM carry ESPN Radio. The studios are at the CityPlex Towers in South Tulsa.

By day, KYAL is powered at 2,500 watts. But because 1550 AM is a Canadian clear channel frequency, KYAL must greatly reduce power at night to 40 watts to avoid interference. It uses a directional antenna with a three-tower array. The transmitter is on South Frankoma Road at Turner Turnpike (Interstate 44) in Sapulpa. Programming is heard around the clock on 250-watt FM translator 99.9 K260CR.

== History ==
The station signed on the air on June 15, 1962. In the 1970s, as KXOJ, the station had a middle of the road (MOR) format, playing popular adult music, news and sports. It was an affiliate of the ABC Information Network.

In the 1980s, it played R&B music, targeting Tulsa's African American community. It later changed its call letters to KBLK as "Power 1550". It was a simulcast of the Urban format from a cable radio station called "Radiovision" that aired on Tulsa Cable's Wanted Ads channel at the time and also bought time on 1550 to broadcast its station. The 1550 signal did not cover Tulsa very well, being that the transmitter was in Sapulpa and was only 500 watts at the time. The station was also a daytimer, required to leave the air at night. By the late 1980s–early 1990s, the station upgraded its power to 2,500 watts in the day and 47 watts after sunset, although still not enough to cover all of Tulsa at night. That gave the station the right to broadcast 24 hours with its R&B format.

By the early 1990s, the lease was not renewed for Radiovision to broadcast on 1550, and the urban contemporary format was dropped along with Radiovision, shutting down its operation. KBLK flipped to a Christian radio format and the call letters returned to KXOJ. It briefly was a simulcast of Contemporary Christian station 100.9 KXOJ-FM. It later tried a Southern Gospel format.

In 2002, Southern Gospel music was dropped for a sports format as "Oklahoma ESPN Radio." It simulcast with 640 KWPN in Oklahoma City. In 2006, KYAL got an FM sister station in the Tulsa radio market, 97.1 KYAL-FM. The two stations mostly simulcast their sports programming.

== Translators ==
Broadcast translator for KYAL
Call sign	Frequency	City of license	FID	ERP (W)	HAAT	Class	FCC info
K260CR	99.9 FM	Sapulpa, Oklahoma	140431	250	189 m (620 ft)	D	LMS
