= KXOJ-FM =

Radio station in Glenpool, Oklahoma

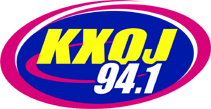
- Glenpool, Oklahoma; United States
- Broadcast area: Tulsa metropolitan area
- Frequency: 94.1 MHz
- Branding: 94.1 KXOJ

Programming
- Format: Christian adult contemporary

Ownership
- Owner: Stephens Media Group; (SMG-Tulsa, LLC)
- Sister stations: KCFO; KMYZ-FM; KTSO; KYAL; KYAL-FM

History
- First air date: February 22, 1977
- Former call signs: KQBC (1977–1985); KOKL-FM (1985–1990); KTHK (1990–1996); KCFM (1996–2000); KTSO (2000–2016)
- Call sign meaning: Excited Over Jesus

Technical information
- Licensing authority: FCC
- Facility ID: 28850
- Class: C1
- ERP: 100,000 watts
- HAAT: 210.7 meters (691 ft)
- Transmitter coordinates: 36°07′52.00″N 96°04′13.00″W
- Translator: HD2: 94.5 K233AU (Tulsa)

Links
- Public license information: Public file; LMS
- Webcast: Listen live
- Website: kxoj.com

KXOJ-FM (94.1 FM) is a commercial radio station licensed to Glenpool, Oklahoma, United States, serving the Tulsa metropolitan area. It airs a Christian adult contemporary format and is owned by the Stephens Media Group, through licensee SMG-Tulsa, LLC. Its studios are located at the CityPlex Towers.

KXOJ-FM's transmitter is in Chandler Park, off West 21st Street in Sand Springs. KXOJ-FM also broadcasts with HD Radio technology; its HD2 subchannel has a contemporary Christian format as "Now 94.5", which feeds 250-watt FM translator K233AU at 94.1 MHz in Tulsa.

== History ==
KXOJ-FM signed on the air on February 22, 1977. It originally broadcast at 100.9 MHz and was the sister station of KXOJ 1550 AM (now KYAL). The stations were originally located in Sapulpa. For its first several decades, it went through several formats and call sign changes, even playing classical music for several years. It also switched its city of license for a while to Okmulgee, Oklahoma.

In 1996, KCFM sold to Shamrock Communications (a division of Times-Shamrock Communications) for $1.8 million.

In 2000, the station's call letters were KTSO, which stood for Tulsa's Soft Oldies.

On November 22, 2012, KTSO started playing all Christmas music, calling itself "Tulsa's Official Christmas Station." After the holidays, it returned to playing the hits of the 1960s, 70s & 80s.

On April 25, 2013, it was announced that Stephens Media Group would acquire KTSO and KMYZ-FM from Times-Shamrock; the sale was completed in October for $8.5 million.

On July 1, 2013, KTSO changed its format to adult contemporary music, branded as "94.1 The Breeze".

KTSO and KXOJ swapped their formats and call letters the morning of August 16, 2016 to increase the overall reach of KXOJ-FM's Christian AC format throughout the Tulsa area, with 94.1's 100,000 watts providing more signal range than the traditionally limited range of 100.9.
