= Mapleton Communications =

Real Estate company

Mapleton Investments
- Type: Real Estate Group
- Genre: Real Estate
- Founded: 2001
- Founder: Adam Nathanson
- Headquarters: Los Angeles, CA,

Mapleton Communications (MC) (now Mapleton Investments) was a media company. It was formed in May 2001 by Adam Nathanson to acquire and operate radio stations in mid-sized markets in the western United States. Mapleton owned and operated 41 radio stations (11 AM and 30 FM) in California, Oregon and Washington State. It was based in Monterey, California. Since 2009, It is now known as Mapleton Investments a real estate group managing more than $750 million of properties, sports teams and investments.

== History ==
Mapleton was founded in 2001 by Adam Nathanson, son of billionaire cable businessman Marc Nathanson. The Nathanson family roots in radio go back to advertising executive Don Paul Nathanson, who first published Radio Showmanship Magazine in 1940. Mapleton Investments is a privately held investment firm based in Los Angeles, founded and owned by the Nathanson family. The company focuses on long-term, multi-generational growth and manages a diverse portfolio that includes real estate, sports teams, and other businesses. Its real estate division, Mapleton Properties, owns and operates a collection of assets valued at around $750 million, spanning apartment buildings, retail spaces, offices, and mixed-use developments across several states, with a strong presence in California. Known for its hands-on approach and conservative strategy, Mapleton emphasizes steady, sustainable growth while preserving family wealth and creating value through strategic acquisitions and developments.

== List of Former Mapleton Stations before selling to Stephens Media Group ==
Alexandria

- KLAA-FM 103.5 Country
- KEZP 104.3 Christian Adult Contemporary
- KBKK 105.5 Classic Country
- KEDG 106.9 Adult contemporary

Chico

- KALF New Country 95.7

Medford

- KTMT 580 Sports
- KTMT-FM 93.7 Top-40
- KBOY-FM 95.7 Classic Rock
- KCMX 880 News/Talk
- KCMX-FM 101.9 Adult Contemporary
- KAKT HD1 105.1 NEW Country
- KAKT HD2 95.1 CLASSIC Country

Merced, California

- KUBB 96.3 Country
- KABX-FM 97.5 Adult Contemporary
- KLOQ-FM 98.7 Regional Mexican
- KHTN 104.7 Top 40
- KYOS 1480 News/Talk
- KBRE 1660 Active Rock

Monroe

- KMYY 92.3 Country
- KNNW 103.1 CHR/Top 40
- KXRR 106.1 Mainstream Rock
- KZRZ 98.3 Adult Contemporary

Monterey-Salinas-Santa Cruz, California

- KCDU 101.7 CHR/Top 40
- KPIG-FM 107.5 Americana
- KHIP 104.3 Classic Rock
- KKHK 95.5 Variety Adult Hits
- KWAV 96.9 Adult Contemporary

Redding, California

- KQMS News Talk 1670 / 104.9 / 105.7
- KSHA K-Shasta Adult Contemporary 104.3
- KWLZ Wild 99-3 Rhythmic CHR 99.3
- KRRX 106X Rock 106.1 / 104.9 Burney
- KNRO Fox Sports 1400 / 103.9
- KRDG Classic Hits 105.3

Spokane

- KBBD 103.9 Adult Hits
- KDRK-FM 93.7 Country
- KEYF-FM 101.1 Classic Hits
- KGA 1510 Sports/Talk
- KJRB 790 Classic Rock
- KZBD 105.7 Top-40

=== Stations divested to Other Groups ===
Chico

- KFMF Rock 93.9 / 100.5 Weaverville
- KQPT Now 107-5 CHR 107.5 /107.9
- KZAP Classic Hits 96.7

San Francisco-Oakland-San Jose

- KSFN 1510 Chinese (Mandarin); licensed to Piedmont, California
