= Rick Rydell =

American radio disc jockey and talk radio host

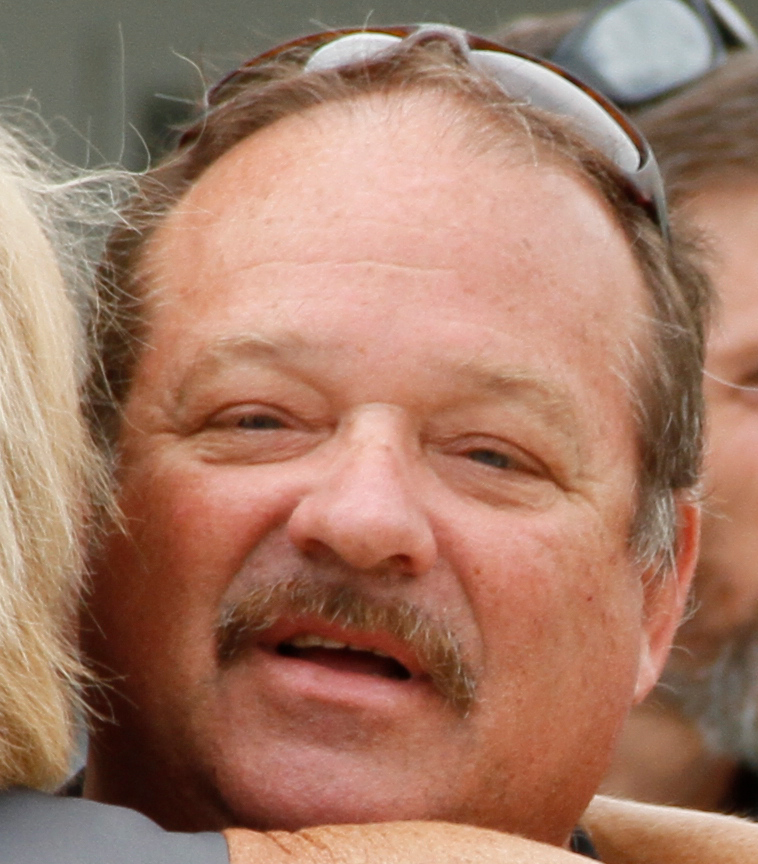
- Rick Rydell
- Born: Richard Green; September 29, 1963 (age 63); Seattle, Washington, U.S.
- Occupations: Fish and Game employee, former radio personality, author/writer, outdoor guide, contractor
- Children: Jake, Cale, Kainoa

Rick Rydell (born Richard Green, September 29, 1963) is an American talk radio host, outdoorsman, writer and author. Rydell enjoyed a long career in radio, most prominently with various stations in the Northwest. His last job in radio was as the morning drive-time host on Anchorage station 650 KENI, until accepting a position in the Alaska Department of Fish and Game offered him by the governor in December 2018.

== Early life ==
Rydell was born on September 29, 1963, in Seattle, Washington, growing up in a working-class family. His mother worked for Boeing as a general laborer, while his father worked as a tool maker for Heath Tecna, a supplier to Boeing. Rydell had three older sisters, one of whom had Down syndrome and died at age 3. He spent his second birthday in a hospital with his father, who was recovering from cancer-induced amputation of one of his legs.

At the beginning of second grade, the family moved to Payette, Idaho, for a new job. It lasted only eight months. The family then moved to Billings, Montana, where his father began a new career in radio.

When Rydell was 16, his parents told him to find a job or move out. In response, he did both. His baseball coach was the program director at KGHL, and offered him a job, with one condition: changing his last name to avoid confusion with his father's radio program,. It was then the radio personality Rick Rydell was born.

== Radio career ==
Rydell first gained notoriety in radio in Spokane, Washington, with following gigs in KXYQ and KMJK in Portland, Oregon, then a two-year stint in Cleveland at WNCX. Rydell was the anchor on morning show that launched Mike Trivisonno and Todd Brandt into radio fame.

In 1990 and moved to Anchorage, Alaska. There, he was hired at a relatively new station, KBFX. Various stations had floundered at the 100.5 frequency in Anchorage for over a decade before it was relaunched as KBFX, playing a classic rock format. Rydell spent a number of years during the early and mid-1990s as KBFX's morning show host, the last several years with co-host Jackie Purcell, the weather director for Anchorage television station KTUU. Being fired in 1996, Rydell suddenly found himself out of work. He spent several years away from Anchorage and away from radio, mostly working in construction. He returned to Anchorage and made the transition to talk radio in 2001, following the retirement of KENI's longtime morning host Dick Lobdell.

Rydell's program focused on local and state politics and current events. The show shot up from 17th to #1 within six months and remained a highly-rated show for years. Rydell then broadcast weekday mornings on 650 KENI Rydell previously simulcast his show to Fairbanks station KFBX, as well as contributed commentaries to the station's newscasts.

Amongst Rydell's awards for his various radio programs, he was named "Best Morning Show" by The Oregonian in 1988, "Best Comedy Series" in 1994, "Best Radio Show" in 2005, and "Most Uniquely Alaskan Radio Show" in 2006 by the Alaska Broadcasters Association. Rydell himself was named Alaska Republican Man of the Year for 2004 by the Republican Party of Alaska. In 2012 Rydell was referred to as an "All-Time Great Local Host" during the Conclave Learning Conference in Minneapolis, Minnesota.

He retired from radio in December 2018 after accepting a position in the Alaska Department of Fish and Game offered him by the governor.

== Bibliography ==
- In September 2007, his first book, Alaska Happens, was published. A book of short stories about hunting and fishing in Alaska. Alaska Happens became one of the best selling Alaska books at local book stores.
- September 2008, Blood on the Tundra. More Hunting, Fishing and Wildlife in Alaska, was published and released. A follow-up to "Alaska Happens" and reported to have "a nostalgic tone to some of the stories" and "a sad farewell to the waning "golden age" of hunting in Alaska during the last half of the 20th century.
- May 2009, began as a regular article contributor for Fish Alaska and Hunt Alaska magazines.

== Personal life ==
He has frequently mentioned on the air over the years that he is a booster of the programs of South Anchorage High School.

He has also worked as a mechanic, lead singer of multiple rock bands, a hunting and fishing guide, and as a contractor.

== Chronological list of radio stations worked ==
- KGHL - Billings, Montana
- KXLO/KLCM - Lewistown, Montana
- KREM (FM) - Spokane, Washington
- KOJM/KPQX - Havre, Montana
- KZLS - Billings
- KZBQ - Pocatello, Idaho
- KWLS (now KMMM) - Pratt, Kansas
- KBLI - Blackfoot, Idaho
- KTKU - Juneau, Alaska
- KZZU - Spokane
- KJRB/KEZE - Spokane
- KKZX - Spokane
- KMJK - Portland, Oregon
- WNCX - Cleveland, Ohio
- KBFX - Anchorage, Alaska
- KNIK - Anchorage
- KENI - Anchorage
- KXLY (AM) - Spokane, Washington
