= KEZE =

- Spokane, Washington; United States
- Broadcast area: Spokane metropolitan area
- Frequency: 96.9 MHz
- Branding: Hot 96.9

Programming
- Format: Rhythmic contemporary
- Affiliations: United Stations Radio Networks

Ownership
- Owner: Morgan Murphy Media; (QueenB Radio, Inc.)
- Sister stations: KHTQ, KXLX, KXLY, KXLY-FM, KXLY-TV, KXMN-LD, KVNI, KZZU-FM

History
- First air date: February 1993
- Former call signs: KSPO (1993–1996)
- Call sign meaning: "Easy" (former format of 105.7 FM)

Technical information
- Licensing authority: FCC
- Facility ID: 41119
- Class: C2
- ERP: 8,200 watts
- HAAT: 365 meters (1,198 ft)
- Transmitter coordinates: 47.726°N 117.169°W

Links
- Public license information: Public file; LMS
- Webcast: Listen Live
- Website: hot969.com

KEZE (96.9 FM "Hot 96.9") is a commercial radio station licensed to Spokane, Washington. It is owned by Morgan Murphy Media, with the license held by QueenB Radio, and it airs a rhythmic contemporary radio format.

The studios and offices are on West Boone Avenue in Spokane. KEZE's transmitter is located in the Antoine Peak Conservation Area in Otis Orchards, Washington.

== KEZE history ==
=== KSPO ===
In February 1993, the station signed on as KSPO under the ownership of Melinda Boucher Read, and airing a Christian radio format. It also carried news from the Mutual Broadcasting System. In an era where few women were in charge at radio stations, Read served as the general manager and CEO of the station.

On March 4, 1996, KSPO moved to 106.5 FM, clearing 96.9 for KEZE to take over the frequency. KSPO is now the flagship station for the "American Christian Network".

=== Easy listening and rock ===
The KEZE call sign started out in 1979 at 105.7 MHz, using the identification "KEZE, E-Z listening". It initially aired beautiful music.

In 1979, KEZE-FM was acquired by Kaye-Smith Enterprises. Kaye-Smith already owned Top 40 station KJRB, so the FM was flipped to a format that would also bring in young listeners, album-oriented rock. KEZE called itself "Rock 106 – Spokane's Best Rock". In 1989, KJRB and KEZE were acquired by Apollo Broadcasting. Under Apollo, KEZE leaned more toward active rock, with plenty of harder-edged rock acts on its playlist. Some of the core artists included Led Zeppelin, Night Ranger, The Rolling Stones, Ozzy Osbourne, and Def Leppard.

With the emergence of grunge and "the Seattle sound" in the late 1980s and early 1990s, KEZE began emphasizing more heavy guitar-based alternative rock, including Soundgarden, Alice in Chains and Nirvana. On October 20, 1995, the station flipped to adult album alternative (AAA) as KAEP, "105.7 the Peak".

=== KEZE moves to 96.9 ===
The rock format and KEZE call letters moved to 96.9 FM on March 4, 1996. As the public appeal of guitar-based alternative waned in the mid-1990s, KEZE attempted a "back to our roots" campaign as a classic rock station in 1996. In March 1999, KEZE flipped to an all-1980s hits format, known as "Star @ 96-9."

In 2003, KEZE began adding some 1990's music. By the next year, it evolved to an adult top 40 format. The morning show on the station was well-known local hosts "The Breakfast Boys", Dave Sposito and Ken Hopkins, who are now on sister station KZZU-FM.

=== Rhythmic hits ===
On October 12, 2005, the station flipped to rhythmic top 40, a move that might have been spurred by rumors that another station might move into the Spokane radio market to fill the void after KYWL dropped the rhythmic format in 2004. Those rumors became reality in December 2005 when KQQB-FM signed on with the same format as KEZE's, even though KEZE had an advantage over KQQB in terms of signal coverage of Spokane County. KQQB evolved into a Mainstream Top 40 direction, thus leaving KEZE as the only Rhythmic Contemporary station in the market.

During this time, KEZE was known as "Wired 96.9" with the slogan "Blazin' Today's Hottest Music." It was the Spokane affiliate for the Portland based morning show The Playhouse. Though "Wired" was a generally successful station, ratings began to decline in early 2008.

=== Switch to country ===
On November 20, 2008, KEZE began stunting with Christmas music, leaving Spokane without a rhythmic top 40 station and led to speculation the station would flip formats.

On December 25, 2008, KEZE flipped to country, branding itself as "Coyote Country". This made KEZE the fourth station in the Spokane area to broadcast a country format on the FM band, along with KDRK "The Cat", KIXZ-FM "KIX 96" and KICR "K102 Country". Shortly after the flip, KEZE's ratings improved, despite the four-way competition.

On May 15, 2009, Coyote Country added The Jay and Kevin Show in morning drive time. Jay and Kevin had previously aired on KDRK for 11 years. Jay and Kevin were joined by Sean "Slim" Widmer, formerly of Spokane's Sports Show, as their producer.

=== Adult alternative ===
On January 1, 2010, KEZE and KXLY-FM swapped formats, with the country format moving to 99.9 FM, while KXLY-FM's modestly successful AAA format as "River" branding moved to KEZE. On November 12, 2010, the station flipped to all-Christmas, making it the second time in the station's history that 96.9 has switched to Christmas music. The AAA format returned after the holidays. However, after the temporary holiday music phase, it was obvious that the Morgan Murphy/Spokane management had not found a successful formula for bringing the station decent ratings.

=== Return to rhythmic ===
On April 20, 2011, station management announced that KEZE would return to a rhythmic top 40 format. It had already set up Facebook and Twitter accounts ahead of the switch, which revealed the station's new logo and moniker.

On May 4, 2011, at 3:05 p.m., "The River" signed off with "Tree by the River" by Iron and Wine. The station then launched "Hot 96.9" with "Roll Up" by Wiz Khalifa. With the return to rhythmic contemporary, KEZE faced another rhythmic station, KGZG, whose signal coverage requires a booster in Spokane (and who responded to KEZE's switch by setting up a website called "Not969.com" to direct listeners to its station). Since its return to rhythmic, KEZE has seen its two competitors, KGZG and KPXR-FM, leave the format in 2014: KGZG went dark on April 7, 2014 (and would later return as KNHK-FM), while KPXR dropped Top 40/CHR to return to country the following month, and later flipped to alternative as KFOO-FM. With those flips, KEZE became the market's only rhythmic contemporary outlet.
