= KXLY =

KXLY may refer to:

- KXLY (AM), a radio station (920 AM) licensed to Spokane, Washington, United States
- KXLY-FM, a radio station (99.9 FM) licensed to Spokane, Washington, United States
- KXLY-TV, a television station (channel 13, virtual 4) licensed to Spokane, Washington, United States
