= KXLE =

KXLE may refer to:

- KXLE (AM), a radio station (1240 AM) licensed to Ellensburg, Washington, United States
- KXLE-FM, a radio station (95.3 FM) licensed to Ellensburg, Washington, United States
