= KCKO (Washington) =

Radio station in Millwood–Spokane, Washington (1957–1985)

- Millwood, Washington; United States
- Broadcast area: Spokane
- Frequency: 1380 kHz

Ownership
- Owner: Great American Radio Corporation

History
- First air date: February 12, 1957
- Last air date: 1985
- Former call signs: KPEG (1957–1970); KEZE (1970–1979)

Technical information
- Power: 5,000 watts (day); 2,500 watts (night)
- Transmitter coordinates: 47°36′52″N 117°20′52″W

KCKO was a radio station broadcasting on 1380 AM last licensed to Millwood, Washington, United States, a suburb of Spokane. The station was last owned by the Great American Radio Corporation, broadcasting from 1957 to 1985.

== History ==
Martha and Robert Rapp obtained a construction permit for a new 5,000-watt daytime-only radio station on 1380 kHz, licensed to Spokane, on September 5, 1956. The station, Spokane's eighth, debuted February 12, 1957, as KPEG. Except for manager Jerrell Henry, the station boasted an all-woman staff, and all of the station's on-air personalities used the first name "Peg". A newspaper advertisement on launch day described the station as "the woman's personal radio station" and "the most unusual radio station on the West Coast".

It did not take long for ownership to change at the young station. On July 2, the Rapps filed to sell KPEG to Bellevue Broadcasters, mostly owned by Kemper Freeman and Elwell Case and owners of KFKF at Bellevue; KPEG fetched $137,500, while the Rapps simultaneously sold Bellevue a construction permit for a radio station at Portland, Oregon, for $2,500. By the start of 1960, KPEG had flipped to a country music format; the air staff included the "KPEG Cowboys" of "Cliff Carl", "Detour Dick", and "Silver City Ed". The studios were moved twice in less than four years, first to a site on Boone Avenue, then to the KPEG transmitter site at 6019 S. Crestline on the city's south side.

In 1970, Bellevue Broadcasters acquired KTWD, a standalone FM station, for $25,000. The call letters were changed to KEZE on October 12, and the AM and FM became a simulcasting pair with an easy listening format.

Bellevue filed to sell the KEZE stations to separate buyers in 1977. The FM station was sold to Kaye-Smith Enterprises, owners of local AM outlet KJRB; the AM station was sold to the Great American Radio Company, led by Brent Larson and Rune Goranson, for $175,000. The sale process was held up by an objection made by a former KJRB employee to the sale of the stations to Kaye-Smith and renewals of that firm's existing radio outlets in the region; the Federal Communications Commission approved the sales and most of the renewals in May 1979. The FM station retained the KEZE calls, so 1380 AM became KCKO.

While the sale application was pending, Great American Radio filed to move the station to a site at 44th and Havana streets—later changed to 29th and Havana—and change the city of license to Millwood, in order to initiate nighttime service with 2,500 watts. This was approved in December 1979. The station cycled through three formats in three years, including adult contemporary, oldies, and gospel music. Meanwhile, the station received several extensions on its Millwood construction permit.

In March 1982, the Spokesman-Review reported that KCKO was in the process of being sold to a group of West Coast investors that would flip the station to an all-news format, competing with KSPO (1230 AM)—Spokane's established news outlet—in conjunction with the activation of the Millwood transmitter facility. The sale failed to materialize, but a format change did, as the station began broadcasting Christian programming and using the new Millwood site. Said site, however, proved itself a technical boondoggle. In September, an FCC field engineer from Seattle cited KCKO for 17 technical violations; meanwhile, the county and local residents were alarmed that the three energized towers at the site were not protected by fences, leading to potential risks were someone to touch the towers. The county ordered KCKO to put up fencing pursuant to the terms of its special zoning permit, and it was installed within several days. Even then, the site's rocky terrain delayed the installation of grounding systems for two of the three towers, used for nighttime operation.

In January 1984, Larson filed to sell his majority stake in Great American Radio Corporation to minority owner Marketing Systems International, controlled by Roger Larson of Reno, Nevada. During this time, several music publishing companies sued the station for alleged copyright infringement. The Marketing Systems International sale evidently fell through, as Great American Radio Corporation then filed to sell the license for $15,000 and a $195,000 note to Communication Services International, owned by Gary C. Fornia of Utah.

KCKO signed off during mid-1985; in 1989, the FCC ordered the station to show cause why its license should not be revoked for the extended silence. Larson responded to the order, stating he believed the license had been canceled years prior and asking the commission to cancel it, which it did in an order dated April 25, 1989.
