= KSVY (Washington) =

Radio station in Opportunity–Spokane, Washington (1962–1996)

- Opportunity, Washington; United States
- Broadcast area: Spokane, Washington
- Frequency: 1550 kHz

Ownership
- Owner: Harold Orr dba Harold Leasing

History
- First air date: September 1, 1962
- Last air date: July 18, 1996
- Former call signs: KDNC (1962–1974); KXXR (1974–1987)
- Call sign meaning: Spokane Valley

Technical information
- Facility ID: 26178
- Class: B
- Power: 10,000 watts (day); 2,500 watts (night)
- Transmitter coordinates: 47°36′39.6″N 117°14′27.6″W

KSVY was a radio station operating at 1550 AM and licensed to Opportunity, Washington, United States, serving Spokane. It operated from 1962 to 1996.

== History ==
KDNC went on air September 1, 1962. The station broadcast during the day at 1440 kHz and was owned by the Independent Broadcasting Corporation, with transmitter at Havana and 44th in Spokane; it aired a "golden music" format. After two years in operation, KDNC moved its studios to the Davenport Hotel. KDNC also spawned KDNC-FM 93.7, which signed on September 30, 1965. Alexander P. Hunter of Spokane acquired KDNC-AM-FM in 1967 and sold it two years later to Radford Sorensen, Wayne Wakefield and Edward Kelley for US$158,813 (equivalent to $1,394,297 in 2025).

KDNC became KXXR on April 15, 1974. The AM station was playing country music in 1979, beautiful music in 1980 and the Music of Your Life format in 1981. The station also broadcast some sporting events; after initially agreeing to carry University of Idaho football for the 1983 season, it abruptly dropped the Vandals after one game to carry University of Notre Dame football instead.

KXXR changed frequency from 1440 to 1550 kHz in January 1984 as part of a major facility change that saw the city of license change from Spokane to Opportunity, as well as a daytime power increase to 10,000 watts and the beginning of nighttime service with 2,500 watts from a new tower site. The new tower site had been approved in 1981, even though local residents feared that the construction of a radio facility close to a school would cause issues with construction crews, as had happened with KGA at another school site.

Harold Orr, who had been the station's president in 1975, acquired the station in 1983 after being a former creditor. Orr, whose primary business ventures were 115 H&R Block tax offices in Oregon and Washington and a leasing company, took the money-losing station off the air in October 1985—after a six-month stint with pop music—but he retained the license. When the Federal Communications Commission (FCC) told him he had to keep the station on the air 72 hours a week to keep the license active, he responded by bringing in former general manager Dick Wright to put together a team of young announcers to run the station 12 hours a day, 6 days a week, beginning in September 1987. The new KSVY did not play commercials, clinging instead to a mix of big band music and oldies, all while remaining up for sale. In 1990, the format shifted to classical music, interrupted by sports broadcasts (including the return of Idaho football) which subsidized the remainder of the operation.

=== Closure ===
At noon on July 18, 1996, vandals broke in and caused $32,000 (equivalent to about $66,000 in 2025) in damage to the station's equipment, an act that turned out to be the end of KSVY. The station never resumed operations, though Orr paid for years to keep the tower beacons lit until the facility was finally dismantled in 2005. The license was officially canceled by the FCC on April 14, 1999.
