= KLCM =

KLCM may refer to:

- KLCM (FM), a radio station (88.1 FM) licensed to serve Ulysses, Kansas, United States; see List of radio stations in Kansas
- KQPZ, a radio station (95.9 FM) licensed to serve Lewistown, Montana, United States, which held the call sign KLCM from 1978 to 2018
