= KXLO =

- Lewistown, Montana; United States
- Frequency: 1230 kHz
- Branding: KXLO 106.9 FM 1230 AM

Programming
- Format: Country music

Ownership
- Owner: KXLO Broadcast, Inc.
- Sister stations: KQPZ

History
- First air date: June 24, 1947

Technical information
- Licensing authority: FCC
- Facility ID: 35963
- Class: C
- Power: 1,000 watts
- Transmitter coordinates: 47°04′13″N 109°24′26″W
- Translator: 106.9 K295BQ (Lewistown)

Links
- Public license information: Public file; LMS
- Webcast: Listen Live
- Website: www.kxloradio.com

KXLO (1230 AM) is a radio station broadcasting a country music format in Lewistown, Montana, United States. The station is currently owned by KXLO Broadcast, Inc. Radio host Rick Rydell started his radio career at KXLO.

== History ==
The Capital Broadcasting Company applied for a construction permit and were granted authority on April 3, 1946, to build a new 250-watt radio station on a frequency of 1230 kHz. KXLO was the creation of brothers George and Russell Bennitt, owners of the Lewistown Democrat-News and Argus-Farmer newspapers. The Bennitts sold their newspaper interests to Ken Byerly in 1947 but retained the radio construction permit.

KXLO started broadcasting on June 24, 1947. Its staff consisted entirely of World War II veterans. The power was increased from 250 to 1,000 watts during the day in March 1962.

The ownership of the station has changed several times over the years. In 1949, the Bennitts sold the station to William G. Kelly and Victor J. Morgan doing business as the Montana Broadcasting Company; Kelly became the sole owner in 1950. Three years later, Marlin G. Obie of North Dakota joined Kelly, eventually incorporating as Central Montana Broadcasting Company. KXLO was sold in 1958 to Asger Mikkelsen. Obie, along with Leroy Tappe and David L. Sather, purchased the station in 1959, changing its corporate name to KXLO Broadcast, Inc. Obie and Tappe sold their interests in 1960 to Sather, William Yaeger and Lewis G. Boucher.

Fred Lark of Boone, Iowa, purchased controlling interest in KXLO in a deal agreed in 1972 and approved in 1973. Two years later, KXLO expanded to FM broadcasting with the establishment of KLCM, which had studios in the basement of the KXLO building. Lark, also a pilot, was known to fly to the scene of news stories and kept the stations intensely local, with an eclectic music playlist and local news and sports coverage. In October 2005, KXLO began to broadcast 24 hours a day.

In 2011, an FM translator was added atop the Moccasin Mountains, giving KXLO an FM signal on 106.9 MHz.
