= KHTQ =

Radio station in Hayden, Idaho

Coordinates: 47.659°N 116.964°W

- Hayden, Idaho; United States
- Broadcast area: Spokane, Washington
- Frequency: 94.5 MHz
- Branding: Rock 94½

Programming
- Format: Active rock
- Affiliations: Seahawks Radio Network

Ownership
- Owner: Morgan Murphy Media; (QueenB Radio, Inc.)
- Sister stations: KEZE, KXLX, KXLY, KXLY-FM, KXLY-TV, KXMN-LD, KVNI, KZZU-FM

History
- First air date: November 1, 1991 (as KKCH)
- Former call signs: KMWC (1989–1991, CP); KKCH (1991–1995)
- Call sign meaning: "Hits" (previous format)

Technical information
- Licensing authority: FCC
- Facility ID: 49244
- Class: C
- ERP: 83,000 watts
- HAAT: 665 meters

Links
- Public license information: Public file; LMS
- Webcast: Listen live; Listen live
- Website: rock945.com

KHTQ is an active rock outlet licensed to Hayden, Idaho and serving the Spokane, Washington area. They broadcast at 94.5 MHz on the FM dial with an effective radiated power of 83 kW and is owned by Morgan Murphy Media.

== History ==
KHTQ, whose moniker is "Rock 94 1/2", has been offering a current-based mix of today's cutting-edge rock. modern rock and heavy metal hits since their flip from adult top 40 in 1998. As a top 40 station, KHTQ had a very adult lean, as Spokane did not have any hot AC stations at the time. KHTQ competed with very successful "93 Zoo FM", which would later become owned by the same company. At that time, Zoo FM played a pop/rhythmic hybrid presentation, which gave KHTQ the station for adult audiences. In its last year as a top 40 the station mixed in harder rock which culminated into a flip to active rock in 1998. After changing formats, "Rock 94 1/2" originally aired a rock/alternative hybrid, which was common among rock stations at the time. While playing bands such as Korn, Limp Bizkit, Sevendust, Slipknot and other new metal acts. They occasionally played acts like AC/DC and Ozzy Osbourne, but mostly classic metal to distance themselves from 105.7 the Peak, which also mixed in harder alternative music.

KHTQ and the Morgan Murphy Media were one of three radio groups caught up in the New York District Attorney Elliot Spitzer Payola Scandal in 2005-06.

It is also Spokane's affiliate of the Seattle Seahawks radio network.

Notable Air-Talent has included: GA (Gary Allen), The Stunt Double JP a.k.a. Josh Pryor, "Krazy Aunt" Karla8, "Uncle" Larry Pearson, Brufus P Owsley, Barry "FNG" Bennett, The "Shock-Doctor", Tripp Rogers, Geoff Scott, Kris "Beavis" Seibers, Ken "O'Doule" Richards, Kevin Hagen, Sean Knight, Stephanie Marr, Roxxy Davis, Greg Mills, Angel "Dangerchick", Steve Hawk, Larry Snider, and "Jumpy" the Rock-Dog and Scotty "Buns of" Steele.

KHTQ has been nominated for a RadioContraband Rock Radio award for "Medium Market Radio Station of the Year" in 2011 and 2012.

KHTQ was inducted into the Rock Radio Hall of Fame in 2014.

== See also ==
- List of radio stations in Idaho
- List of radio stations in Washington (state)
