= KYOS =

Radio station in Merced, California

- Merced, California; United States
- Frequency: 1480 kHz

Programming
- Format: Talk radio (weekdays); Oldies (weekends)
- Affiliations: Townhall News; Premiere Networks; Westwood One

Ownership
- Owner: Stephens Media Group; (SMG-Merced, LLC)
- Sister stations: KABX-FM, KBRE, KHTN, KLOQ-FM, KUBB

History
- First air date: October 1936
- Former frequencies: 1040 kHz (1936–1941); 1080 kHz (1941–1942); 1480 kHz (1942–1949)

Technical information
- Licensing authority: FCC
- Facility ID: 41174
- Class: B
- Power: 4,300 watts (day); 75 watts (night)
- Transmitter coordinates: 37°17′31″N 120°26′03″W
- Translator: 107.3 K297BU (Merced)

Links
- Public license information: Public file; LMS
- Webcast: Listen live
- Website: www.1480kyos.com

KYOS (1480 AM) is a commercial radio station licensed to Merced, California, United States. The station is owned by the Stephens Media Group, through subsidiary SMG-Merced, LLC. KYOS airs a talk radio format on weekdays and oldies on weekends. The offices are on West 19th Street in Merced.

The transmitter is sited on North Coffee Street in Merced, near California SR 140 (Central Yosemite Highway). Programming is also heard on low-power FM translator K297BU at 107.3 MHz in Merced.

== History ==
KYOS signed on the air in October 1936. It was originally powered at only 250 watts. KYOS carried programming from the Mutual Broadcasting System and the Don Lee Network.

As network programming moved to television, KYOS switched to a Contemporary Top 40 format in the 1960s and 70s, and in the 1980s to adult contemporary music. In the 1980s, listeners increasingly switched to FM for music, so WYOS added talk shows to its evening schedule. In the 1990s, it made the transition to a talk radio format.

In 2002, Mapleton Communications acquired KYOS. Effective September 30, 2019, Mapleton sold it to the Stephens Media Group.

Logo before translator sign on

During its early years as a talk station, WYOS carried The Rush Limbaugh Show in late mornings. While the Oakland Athletics were playing in the Bay Area, KYOS carried the games.

On February 29, 2016, KYOS was granted an FCC construction permit to move to a new site, decrease day power to 4,300 watts and decrease night power to 75 watts. It uses a single-tower non-directional antenna.

== Programming ==
Casey Steed hosts the station's local morning show; nationally syndicated conservative talk shows comprise the remainder of KYOS's weekday schedule. Oldies music is featured on the weekends.
