= Radio Paradise =

- Eureka, California; United States

Programming
- Language: English
- Format: Adult-oriented rock, pop, electronic, world, classic hits, country, oldies

Ownership
- Owner: William Goldsmith

History
- First air date: February 2000

Links
- Website: RadioParadise.com

Radio Paradise is a non-commercial, listener-supported Internet radio station. The station is based in the United States, has a user base of thousands of simultaneous listeners, and a broad international audience.

== Streams ==
Radio Paradise's streams are available in multiple compressed audio formats, as well as lossless FLAC. These streams can be accessed on many kinds of devices and operating systems.

The players buffer the stream ahead, which allows users to skip individual tracks. The players provide detailed information on the artist being played, including data from the artist's Wikipedia page, the album cover, lyrics, distribution of user ratings, and a scrolling list of often colorful user comments, sometimes embellished with videos.

The website and playout systems use Linux and customized open-source software components for most of its sections, a system devised by Goldsmith initially for KPIG's playout system.

== History ==
The station was started in February 2000 by William Goldsmith and his wife, Rebecca Goldsmith. William had worked in radio since leaving high school in 1971 and began to experiment with webcasting in 1995. Radio Paradise was originally operated from the Goldsmith's home in Paradise, California, from which the station derives its name. The station had relocated to the Borrego Valley (east of San Diego, California) in 2016, before the town of Paradise was largely destroyed by the Camp Fire in November 2018. In 2022, Rebecca retired, and William's daughter, Alanna, assumed Rebecca's role. The station relocated to Eureka, California.

Radio Paradise was featured in a TIME magazine article from April 11, 2004, called "The Revolution in Radio".

In April 2006, Radio Paradise introduced the Listeners World Map, showing the numbers and locations of listeners across the world, currently located under Community/Who's Listening.

In June 2006, Radio Paradise began trial runs of Octoshape, a proprietary implementation of Adaptive bitrate streaming, for its 192 kbit/s MP3 stream. In September 2006, the station began a 128 kbit/s AAC stream. In 2012, RP began a 320 kbp/s AAC stream and is now also offering lossless (FLAC/ALAC) streaming.

=== 2007 royalty rate increase ===
On March 6, 2007, the Copyright Royalty Board increased royalty rates, which would have raised the station's royalty fees tenfold. In subsequent negotiations, royalty rates were established that allowed Radio Paradise and other Internet radio stations to continue their operation.
