= KPIG-FM =

Radio station in Freedom, California

- Freedom, California; United States
- Broadcast area: Santa Cruz–Monterey–Salinas, California
- Frequency: 107.5 MHz
- Branding: K-PIG

Programming
- Format: Progressive–full-service

Ownership
- Owner: Stephens Media Group; (SMG-Monterey, LLC)
- Sister stations: KCDU; KHIP; KKHK; KWAV

History
- First air date: 1987
- Former call signs: KPIG (1987–2005)
- Call sign meaning: Pig

Technical information
- Licensing authority: FCC
- Facility ID: 54745
- Class: A
- ERP: 5,400 watts
- HAAT: 103 meters (338 ft)
- Transmitter coordinates: 36°50′5.8″N 121°42′25.8″W
- Repeater: 94.9 KPYG (Cayucos)

Links
- Public license information: Public file; LMS
- Webcast: Listen live
- Website: kpig.com

KPIG-FM (107.5 FM, "K-PIG") is a radio station licensed to Freedom, California, United States. Founded in 1988, the studio is based in Watsonville, California, and broadcasts to the counties of Santa Cruz and Monterey. KPIG is known for its eclectic programming format that combines Americana, alt-country, folk, blues, and classic rock, along with irreverent DJ commentary and local community involvement. It also has a radio repeater on 94.9 MHz FM in San Luis Obispo County as KPYG (since 2004). The station's logo, designed by John F. Johnson, features a sunglasses-wearing pig in farmer's clothing and a cowboy hat, as well as its branding, website and city of license. It has been owned by Stephens Media Group since October 2019.

== History ==
The station signed on in 1987 as KPIG (without the -FM suffix). The suffix would be added in 2005.

KPIG is among the first radio stations in the world to webcast their program, going online on August 2, 1995 during Cousin Al's show. Frequently song requests are submitted via e-mail from listeners around the globe. Indirect references to KPIG appear in the songs "I'm Coming Home" by Robert Earl Keen and "Beer Run" (which references the Robert Keen song and KPIG DJ "Sleepy John") by Todd Snider, both of whom are frequently featured on the air and perform at KPIG's events.

In 2001, the station was bought by Mapleton Communications.

In March 2010, KPIG placed its audio stream behind a paywall. On October 1, 2012, KPIG launched an ad-free "KPIG Online Radio" app in the Apple App Store. A monthly subscription purchased through the official website is required for streaming.

In 2015, Mapleton sold repeater KPYG to Dimes Media. Mapleton continued operating it after the sale closed.

On July 1, 2019, Mapleton announced its intent to sell its remaining 37 radio stations to Stephens Media Group. Stephens began operating the station that same day. The sale was consummated on September 30, 2019. The station has continued its longtime format after the closure of the acquisition, although the fate of KPYG is still being determined.

== Programs ==
KPIG operates a loosely defined progressive full service format encompassing folk, blues, rock, and Americana. As the station's license city is (appropriately) Freedom, California, it has a freeform presentation, with disc jockeys given authority to choose their own playlists. KPIG has strong community ties featuring local programming, sponsors, news and commentary. KPIG also operates the Hog Call line, a free community call-in line for leaving recorded announcements that will be played on the air. Much like newspaper classifieds, common "Hog Calls" are regarding items for sale or upcoming community events.

Among its most well known programs are "Sunday Night Dead" with Grateful Don Potter, "Uncle Sherman's Dirty Boogie" on Saturday nights, "Please Stand By" the in-studio live music show, on Sunday mornings. "Please Stand By", formerly hosted by Sleepy John Sandidge, features local and world-famous Country, Folk, and Blues acts. The station also hosts several popular music festivals each year including the Humbug Hoedown in December, and is the radio volunteer for the free music festival each October in Golden Gate Park called Hardly Strictly Bluegrass. In 2019, Choo Choo Charlie, formerly known as Daylight Charlie from the Cousin Al's Bluegrass Show, returned to KPIG radio hosting the Alternative Roots Bluegrass and Beyond Show.

== Connection to KFAT ==
KPIG's predecessor was KHIP in Hollister, California after KFAT died. KHIP did not have as strong a signal & its coverage was not as widespread as KFAT's signal from the top of Loma Prieta, the highest peak in Northern California's Santa Cruz Mountains.

KFAT, broadcast out of Gilroy, California from 1975 to 1983, at which time it became KWSS. KFAT specialized in true Country and Folk as well as many off-beat oddities. Archived tapes of broadcasts are still streamed from *this archiving website and some history and memories are available at the *KFAT.com website

Much of KPIG's founding staff and current on-air personalities worked at KFAT & KHIP.

== Related information ==
Program Director, Laura Ellen Hopper (April 29, 1950 – May 28, 2007), who had helped found KFAT in 1975, had produced a side-project webcast, the Cowboy Cultural Society web site and stream that plays contemporary and classic Cowboy music.

Former morning disc jockey Dallas Dobro is also the regular mainstage Master of Ceremonies at the twice-annual Strawberry Music Festival in Camp Mather, Yosemite, California. Dobro left the station in 2006 and now resides and works in radio in Petaluma, California.

"Wild" Bill Goldsmith, KPIG's former webmaster, and the person who first put its program on the web, founded Radio Paradise, a webcast of "Eclectic Online Rock".

John F. Johnson (October 7, 1944 – January 23, 2017) of Teapot Graphics (Santa Cruz, California) designed the logo in 1990. The logo is used on the ubiquitous bumper sticker and it, along with other artwork has created a look-and-feel for the station. Over KPIG's first 25 years John designed advertising and merchandise including t-shirts, calendars, CD packages and posters which are very popular with the listeners.

== National syndication ==
Effective December 31, 2007, radio format syndication firm Dial Global offers KPIG's programming to other stations across the United States via satellite distribution. KPIG's programming is offered to stations as either a primary format, or via a station's HD Radio subchannel. The format makes KPIG one of only three terrestrial based radio superstations in the United States (WBBR: a business-talk radio station, and WFAN: a sports station, both in New York City, being the others).
