= Richard Brown (journalist) =

Canadian journalist (born 1952)

Richard Brown (born c. 1952) is a Canadian journalist from Prince Albert, Saskatchewan.

== Career ==
Brown is a former high school teacher and speech writer for Liberal Party of Canada. He started broadcast journalism with CFRN in Edmonton, Alberta.

In 1981 he was one of the first news presenters of CNN Headline News. He has also presented news at Global TV Toronto, CTV Toronto, WCBS-TV NYC, KGO-TV San Francisco (1990–96), and KXLY-TV Spokane, Washington (1998–2007). He hosted a daily radio talk show on CKOM and CJME in Saskatchewan. In 2013, Brown was appointed Chief Communications Officer for the then-mayor of Saskatoon, Saskatchewan, Don Atchison.

Brown has received eight Emmys, Radio Television News Directors Association and Associated Press awards, and the George Foster Peabody medal for his coverage of the Rwanda Civil War and Refugee Crisis in 1994.
