= KVNI =

- Coeur d'Alene, Idaho; United States
- Broadcast area: Spokane metropolitan area
- Frequency: 1080 kHz
- Branding: 92.5 Classic Hits

Programming
- Format: Classic hits

Ownership
- Owner: Morgan Murphy Media / Spokane Television Group; (QueenB Radio, Inc.)
- Sister stations: KEZE, KHTQ, KXLX, KXLY, KXLY-FM, KXLY-TV, KXMN-LD, KZZU-FM

History
- First air date: 1948; 78 years ago
- Call sign meaning: "Voice of North Idaho"

Technical information
- Licensing authority: FCC
- Facility ID: 49245
- Class: B
- Power: 10,000 watts (day); 1,000 watts (night); 88 watts (translator)
- Transmitter coordinates: 47°36′59.00″N 116°43′11.00″W
- Translator: 92.5 K223AN (Coeur d'Alene)

Links
- Public license information: Public file; LMS
- Webcast: Listen live
- Website: 925classichits.com

KVNI (1080 kHz) is a commercial AM radio station licensed to Coeur d'Alene, Idaho, serving the Spokane metropolitan area of Eastern Washington and Northern Idaho. It is owned by Morgan Murphy Media, with the license held by QueenB Radio, Inc. Morgan Murphy owns seven radio stations and a TV station in the Spokane area.

KVNI airs a classic hits radio format which is also heard on its FM translator station K223AN. The station's moniker is "92.5 Classic Hits", referring to the translator's dial position at 92.5 MHz.

KVNI's studios are at the QueenB Radio offices on West Boone Avenue in Spokane, Washington, and its transmitter is located several miles southeast of Coeur d'Alene. The station is powered at 10,000 watts, using a non-directional antenna by day. Because AM 1080 is a clear-channel frequency, reserved for Class A stations KRLD in Dallas and WTIC in Hartford, Connecticut, KVNI reduces power at night to 1,000 watts directional to avoid interference.

== History ==
KVNI first signed on the air in 1948. It originally broadcast on AM 1240 running 250 watts. In 1980, it moved to AM 1080, increasing its daytime power to 10,000 watts and nighttime power to 1,000 watts. In the station's early years, it aired a full-service–MOR format. In 1986, it switched to a soft AC format, with programming from the Satellite Music Network. In February 1999, the station switched to a talk/sports format, as a partial simulcast of KXLY. In November 1999, it adopted a country format, with programming from Westwood One.

In October 2001, the station adopted an oldies format. It was branded "The Mighty 1080" with the slogan "Doo-Woppin' Oldies". In September 2011, the station switched to a sports format as an affiliate of ESPN Radio. On November 20, 2015, KVNI dropped its all-sports format and began playing Christmas music, branded as "92.5 Kootenai FM." On December 26, 2016, the station began airing an adult contemporary format. Less than a year later the format was adjusted to 1990s-based adult hits.

On October 4, 2021, KVNI changed its format classic hits, branded as "92.5 Classic Hits".
