= KXLX =

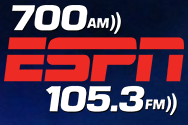
- Airway Heights, Washington; United States
- Broadcast area: Spokane, Washington
- Frequency: 700 kHz
- Branding: ESPN Spokane

Programming
- Format: Sports
- Affiliations: ESPN Radio

Ownership
- Owner: Morgan Murphy Media; (QueenB Radio, Inc.)
- Sister stations: KEZE; KHTQ; KXLY; KXLY-FM; KXLY-TV; KXMN-LD; KVNI; KZZU-FM

History
- First air date: 1983 (as KTMI)
- Former call signs: KTMI (1983–1985); KZUN (1985–1986); KMJY (1986–2004)

Technical information
- Licensing authority: FCC
- Facility ID: 30036
- Class: B
- Power: 10,000 watts (day); 340 watts (night)
- Transmitter coordinates: 47°36′29.8″N 117°22′24.1″W
- Translator: 105.3 K287BV (Spokane)

Links
- Public license information: Public file; LMS
- Webcast: Listen live
- Website: 700espn.com

KXLX (700 AM) is a radio station licensed to Airway Heights, Washington, and broadcasting to the Spokane metropolitan area. The Morgan Murphy Media station broadcasts at 10,000 watts day and 340 watts at night. KXLX is an affiliate of ESPN Radio and is also the home station of the Eastern Washington Eagles football team.

== History ==
According to Federal Communications Commission (FCC) application and license renewal information, KXLX's license was transferred from KMJY which had been broadcasting from Newport, Washington, since June 9, 1986. KMJY was owned and operated by James and Helen Stargel. The call signs for this station before KMJY were KZUN and KTMI. Another Spokane metropolitan area station on 630 kHz in Opportunity, Washington, used the call sign KZUN from 1955 to 1985.

FCC records show that KXLX began broadcasting on 700 kHz on February 27, 2004. In September 2016, FM translator K287BV went on the air relaying KXLX.
