= KXLY-FM =

Radio station in Spokane, Washington

- Spokane, Washington; United States
- Broadcast area: Spokane metropolitan area; Inland Northwest
- Frequency: 99.9 MHz
- Branding: The Big 99.9 Coyote Country

Programming
- Format: Country
- Affiliations: Westwood One

Ownership
- Owner: Morgan Murphy Media; (QueenB Radio, Inc.)
- Sister stations: KEZE; KHTQ; KXLX; KXLY; KXLY-TV; KXMN-LD; KVNI; KZZU-FM

History
- First air date: December 1, 1959
- Call sign meaning: "XL Network" (KXLY (AM) was the flagship station for a regional network)

Technical information
- Licensing authority: FCC
- Facility ID: 61946
- Class: C
- ERP: 37,000 watts
- HAAT: 914 meters (2,999 ft)
- Transmitter coordinates: 47.6594°N 116.9644°W
- Translator: See below

Links
- Public license information: Public file; LMS
- Webcast: Listen live
- Website: thebig999coyotecountry.com

KXLY-FM (99.9 MHz) is a commercial FM radio station in Spokane, Washington, that airs a country music radio format. The station is owned by Morgan Murphy Media, with the license held by QueenB Radio, Inc. KXLY-FM calls itself "The Big 99.9 Coyote Country". Weekdays begin with "The Jay and Kevin Show". Jay and Kevin have been doing morning radio in Spokane since February 13, 1995, and joined Morgan Murphy Media on May 15, 2009.

The studios and offices are on West Boone Avenue in Spokane. The transmitter is on North Summit Road, atop Mount Spokane. The signal can be heard in parts of Washington, Idaho, Oregon, Montana and British Columbia, and it operates translator stations in three communities. KXLY-FM is one of seven local Spokane FM radio stations heard across Canada to subscribers of the Shaw Direct satellite TV service.

== History ==
=== Beautiful music ===
KXLY-FM first signed on the air on December 1, 1959. It was the FM counterpart to KXLY (AM 920), owned by the Northern Pacific Radio and Television Corporation, which also owned KXLY-TV. KXLY-FM was Spokane's second FM station after KREM-FM (now co-owned KZZU-FM). Initially, KXLY-FM had an effective radiated power (ERP) of only 2,000 watts, a fraction of its current output. It mostly simulcast the AM station at first.

In the early 1960s, KXLY-FM was separately programmed with a largely automated beautiful music format. It played fifteen minute sweeps of instrumental music, mostly cover versions of popular songs, along with Broadway and Hollywood showtunes. KXLY-FM continued as an easy listening station for nearly three decades. In 1962, KXLY-AM-FM-TV were acquired by the Spokane Television Company. Spokane Television was later merged into Morgan Murphy Media, based in Madison, Wisconsin.

=== Soft AC and AAA ===
In the 1990s, the easy listening audience was starting to age, while most advertisers seek a younger demographic. KXLY-FM added more soft vocals to its playlist, hoping to attract younger listeners. It used the slogan "It's the music KXLY-FM 100". By the late 1990s, the station made the transition to all vocals as a soft adult contemporary station. It was known as "Classy 99.9fm" and competed against KISC-FM KISS 98.1 FM.

But with several other AC stations on the air in Spokane, KXLY-FM had trouble reaching an audience. On September 12, 2006, the station switched to an adult album alternative (AAA) format branded as "Spokane's River 99dot9".

=== Country music ===
As the first decade of the 2000s was ending, Morgan Murphy Media decided to make a bold move. The Spokane radio market already had two successful country music stations, KDRK, owned by Citadel Broadcasting, and KIXZ, owned by Clear Channel Communications. KDRK and KIXZ were both often in the top ten in the Arbitron ratings.

On January 1, 2010, KXLY-FM's AAA format moved to co-owned KEZE, which had switched to country a couple of years earlier, while KEZE's country format moved to KXLY-FM. KEZE is only powered at 8,200 watts, while KXLY-FM has perhaps the best signal in the Spokane market, broadcasting at 37,000 watts from Mount Spokane, one of the highest peaks in the Inland Northwest, at nearly 3,000 feet (910 meters) in height above average terrain (HAAT). KXLY-FM became the third full-power FM station in Spokane with a country format, calling itself "The Big 99.9 Coyote Country". Premiering on day one was the morning show duo "Jay & Kevin" who moved from competing station KDRK-FM.

KXLY-FM is often Spokane's top country station. (KIXZ, now owned by iHeartMedia, left the country format, switching to alternative rock as KFOO-FM, while KEZE has switched to rhythmic contemporary music.)

== Translators ==
KXLY-FM also rebroadcasts on the following translators:

Broadcast translators for KXLY-FM
| Call sign | Frequency | City of license | FID | ERP (W) | Class | FCC info |
|---|---|---|---|---|---|---|
| K280BE | 103.9 FM | Thompson Falls, Montana | 66963 | 6 | D | LMS |
| K257DH | 99.3 FM | Bonners Ferry, Idaho | 6541 | 18 | D | LMS |

== National radio shows ==
- The Big Time with Whitney Allen
- CMT Country Countdown USA with Lon Helton
