= KHTN =

Radio station in Planada, California

- Planada, California; United States
- Broadcast area: Merced–Madera; (Central California)
- Frequency: 104.7 MHz
- Branding: Hot 104-7

Programming
- Format: Rhythmic contemporary

Ownership
- Owner: Stephens Media Group; (SMG-Merced, LLC)
- Sister stations: KABX-FM; KBRE; KLOQ-FM; KUBB; KYOS

History
- First air date: August 1966
- Former call signs: KLBS-FM (1967–1982); KSNN (1982–1991)
- Former frequencies: 95.9 MHz (1967–1980)

Technical information
- Licensing authority: FCC
- Facility ID: 20334
- Class: B
- ERP: 1,950 watts
- HAAT: 634 meters (2,080 ft)
- Transmitter coordinates: 37°32′00″N 120°01′48″W

Links
- Public license information: Public file; LMS
- Webcast: Listen live
- Website: hot1047fm.com

KHTN (104.7 MHz) is a commercial radio station licensed to Planada, California, and serving the Merced–Madera area of Central California. Owned by Stephens Media Group, the station features a rhythmic contemporary format, with studios on West 19th Street in Merced. KHTN has been a monitored Rhythmic reporter in both Mediabase and Nielsen BDS since the format was launched on KHTN in 1992.

KHTN's transmitter is sited near Mount Bullion, about 20 miles (32 km) northeast of Merced.

== History ==
=== KLBS-FM 95.9 ===
On March 10, 1964, James H. Rose's Los Banos Broadcasting Company obtained a construction permit to start a new FM station at 95.9 MHz in Los Banos, California. Los Banos Broadcasting also owned KLBS 1330 AM. Several months later, the Los Banos Broadcasting Company was sold to John R. McAdam and Edwin Cordeiro. It took two years for the FM station's tower and transmitter to be built.

KLBS-FM signed on the air in August 1966. Because KLBS had been a daytimer station, required to go off the air at night, KLBS-FM was able to keep broadcasting after sunset. KLBS and KLBS-FM had simulcast a format of middle of the road (MOR) music, news, sports and agricultural reports. Several hours a week were devoted to Portuguese language shows. KLBS-FM was limited in power and antenna height, so it was only heard around Los Banos and adjacent communities.

=== Move to 104.7 FM ===
In October 1979, new ownership filed to relocate the station, with the city of license changing to Planada. It would switch its frequency to 104.7 MHz, moving up from Class C to Class B, coupled with a sizable increase in tower height. That would give it a wider coverage area, including the cities of Merced and Madera.

KLBS-FM began broadcasting on the new frequency in the spring of 1980. It had a progressive rock format, calling itself "K-105" with the slogan "The Central Valley's Rock and Roll Alternative". In May 1982, the station was sold to new owners. It changed its call letters to KSNN and flipped the format to satellite-delivered adult contemporary music as "Kissin' 105."

=== Rhythmic Top 40 ===
In April 1992, the station switched to its current Rhythmic Top 40-CHR format. It adopted the KHTN call letters, branding itself as "HOT 105." In 2004, the station re-branded as Hot 104.7 - Number One For Hip Hop.

By 2011, KHTN dropped the "Number One For Hip-Hop" slogan and began to broaden its playlist. It includes rhythmic pop and dance product, although the hip-hop tracks continue to be played as well.

=== Stephens Media ===
In the 2010s, the station was owned by Mapleton Communications, with radio stations in California, Oregon and Washington state. On July 1, 2019, Mapleton Communications announced its intent to sell its remaining 37 stations to Stephens Media Group in a $21 million deal.

Stephens began operating the station that same day. The sale was consummated on September 30, 2019. Stephens Media is based in Tulsa, Oklahoma.
