= KZZU-FM =

Radio station in Spokane, Washington, United States

- Spokane, Washington; United States
- Broadcast area: Spokane metropolitan area, Inland Northwest
- Frequency: 92.9 MHz
- Branding: 92.9 ZZU

Programming
- Format: Adult top 40

Ownership
- Owner: Morgan Murphy Media; (QueenB Radio, Inc.)
- Sister stations: KEZE; KHTQ; KXLX; KXLY; KXLY-FM; KXLY-TV; KXMN-LD; KVNI

History
- First air date: September 1955 (as KREM-FM)
- Former call signs: KREM-FM (1955–1984)
- Call sign meaning: sounds like "zoo" (former branding)

Technical information
- Licensing authority: FCC
- Facility ID: 38493
- Class: C
- ERP: 81,000 watts; (85,000 watts with beam tilt)
- HAAT: 634 meters (2,080 ft)
- Transmitter coordinates: 47.595°N 117.299°W

Links
- Public license information: Public file; LMS
- Webcast: Listen live
- Website: 929zzu.com

KZZU-FM (92.9 FM, "92.9 ZZU") is a commercial FM radio station in Spokane, Washington. The station airs an adult top 40 radio format which the station describes as "Today's Modern Hit Music". KZZU-FM is owned by Morgan Murphy Media, with the license held by QueenB Radio.

KZZU-FM has studios and offices with other Morgan Murphy stations on West Boone Avenue in Spokane. The transmitter is also in Spokane, off South Krell Ridge Lane, on Krell Hill, also known as "Tower Mountain".

== History ==
=== KREM-FM ===
In September 1955, the station signed on as KREM-FM, the first FM station in Spokane. KREM-FM was co-owned with AM 970 KREM (now KTTO). KREM had been founded by Cole E. Wylie in 1946 and operated as a 250-watt station in Spokane. In a 1977 interview with radio broadcaster historian Richard Dunning, KREM was described as the "first non-network, independent, all music station" in Spokane. KREM had also put a television station on the air in 1954, a year before KREM-FM signed on. KREM-TV carried ABC and DuMont Television Network programming at first, but today is a CBS Network affiliate.

In the 1950s and 1960s, when few people owned FM radios, KREM-FM simulcast the AM station's programming. In 1958, KREM-AM-FM-TV were acquired by the Seattle-based King Broadcasting Company. Under King Broadcasting ownership, KREM-AM-FM became a Top 40 station, vying with KJRB for Spokane's young radio listeners. KREM-FM switched to a progressive rock format in the late 1960s, while the AM continued its Top 40 format. Around 1980, KREM-FM moved to a more structured album-oriented rock format, with a playlist of the top tracks from the best selling rock LPs.

=== Switch to KZZU ===
In 1984, the radio stations were sold to Highsmith Broadcasting, while King Broadcasting kept KREM-TV. At the time, different stations could not share the same call sign if they had different owners, with the AM becoming KHIT, while the FM station became KZZU-FM.

The station called itself "KZZU The Zoo" and "93 Zoo FM", launched by Program Director Bill Stairs. The Top 40 format once heard on the AM was switched to the FM station, complete with a "morning zoo". The "Breakfast Boys Morning Show" (first hosted by Jim Arnold and Lee St. Michaels. After Michaels departed, Arnold teamed with Craig Johnson, then Arnold and Dave Sposito, then later with Sposito and Ken Hopkins) played the top hits and discussed pop culture. Notable full-time air personalities included Eric Funk, Todd Brandt, Bo Rafferty, Pete Jensen, Brian Christian, Chuck Matheson, Scott Phillips, Casey Christopher, Lyn Daniels, Dan Roberts, Ronnie Blackwood, Jamie Patrick, Devin James, DK Erickson, Paul Gray and Harrison Wood.

Through the 1980s and 1990s, KZZU aired a mainstream top 40 format. As the 1990s went on, the format shifted toward a more rhythmic contemporary direction with a slight focus on hip hop artists from the Inland Northwest. For a time in 1996 the playlist was so rhythmic magazines shifted the zoo to their rhythmic panel. The Zoo continued with a rhythmic lean through the rest of the 90s. In the early 2000s, changing tastes towards rock music and increased competition caused KZZU to move more towards a rock-leaning Top 40 as hip hop fell to the lower end of its playlist. In its last year as "93 Zoo FM", the station was noted in having an all-female DJ line up with the exception of Rick Dees and Hollywood Hamilton on Sundays.

=== From Zoo FM to ZZU ===
On October 17, 2005, KZZU dropped the "Zoo FM" moniker in favor of "92.9 ZZU", and shifted to adult top 40 in order to more effectively compete with KCDA. The new format left Spokane without a mainstream top 40 outlet for five years. The new format initially leaned alternative as KZZU removed all the hip hop from its playlist. Core artists included The Killers, Audioslave, Switchfoot and Green Day. Co-owned "Wired 96.9" KEZE became Spokane's station for hip hop, R&B and rhythmic pop and dance product. KZZU's new format reunited the Breakfast Boys with Molly Allen, although the station stopped using "The Breakfast Boys" moniker. Dave, Ken, Molly and producer Dan Roberts host the station's morning show, targeting an 18 to 49 year old demographic.

In 2008, after KEZE flipped from rhythmic top 40 to country, KZZU somewhat returned to its CHR roots by adding some rhythmic music during the evening hours while maintaining the Adult Top 40 format during the daytime.

In 2011, KEZE dropped AAA (who adopted the format from KXLY-FM the year prior as part of a format swap) and returned to rhythmic contemporary music as "Hot 96.9". The format flip on KEZE resulted in KZZU dropping most (though not all) rhythmic music to avoid overlapping with KEZE. For a time, Mediabase and Nielsen BDS described KZZU as a hot adult contemporary outlet. KZZU was reclassified as adult top 40 when Mapleton Communications-owned KZBD dropped alternative rock for CHR, becoming "105.7 Now FM".

== Notable personalities ==
- Molly Allen- Former morning radio personality with Dave Sposito and Ken Hopkins. Also daughter of actress Ellen Travolta and niece of actor John Travolta.
