= KUBB =

Radio station in Mariposa, California

Coordinates: 37.534°N 120.030°W

- Mariposa, California; United States
- Broadcast area: Merced area
- Frequency: 96.3 MHz
- Branding: KUBB Country 96.3

Programming
- Format: Country

Ownership
- Owner: Stephens Media Group; (SMG-Merced, LLC)
- Sister stations: KABX-FM KBRE KHTN KLOQ-FM KYOS

History
- First air date: July 4, 1978; 47 years ago

Technical information
- Licensing authority: FCC
- Facility ID: 7707
- Class: B
- ERP: 1,950 watts
- HAAT: 629 meters (2,064 ft)

Links
- Public license information: Public file; LMS
- Webcast: Listen Live
- Website: KUBB.com

KUBB (96.3 MHz) is a commercial FM radio station broadcasting a country music format. Licensed to Mariposa, California, the station serves the Merced area of California's Central Valley. The station is owned by the Stephens Media Group, through licensee SMG-Merced, LLC. The station carries the syndicated morning drive time show Big D and Bubba.

KUBB's studios and offices are in Merced. The transmitter is off North Mount Bullion Hill Road in Mount Bullion. KUBB has an effective radiated power of only 1,900 watts, but with its tower at 629 meters (2064 feet) in height above average terrain (HAAT), its signal covers a good part of the Central Valley, heard in Fresno and Modesto with a good radio.

== History ==
On July 4, 1978, the KUBB signed on for the first time. It was owned by Mariposa Broadcasters and has broadcast from Mount Bullion since going on the air. It has always had a country music format.

=== Acquisition by Stephens Media Group ===
On July 1, 2019, Mapleton Communications announced its intent to sell its remaining 37 stations to the Stephens Media Group. Stephens began operating the station that same day. The sale was consummated on September 30, 2019, at a price of $21 million.
