= KWAV =

Radio station in Monterey, California

Coordinates: 36.535°N 121.622°W

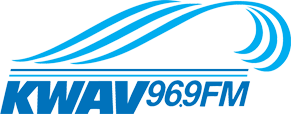
- Monterey, California; United States
- Broadcast area: Salinas–Monterey–Santa Cruz
- Frequency: 96.9 MHz
- Branding: K-Wave 96.9

Programming
- Format: Adult contemporary
- Affiliations: Premiere Networks

Ownership
- Owner: Stephens Media Group; (SMG-Monterey, LLC)
- Sister stations: KCDU, KHIP, KKHK, KPIG-FM

History
- First air date: October 14, 1961; 64 years ago (as KHFR)
- Former call signs: KHFR (1961–1966); KMBY-FM (1966–1968)
- Call sign meaning: "K-Wave"

Technical information
- Licensing authority: FCC
- Facility ID: 7714
- Class: B
- ERP: 18,000 watts
- HAAT: 747 meters (2,451 ft)

Links
- Public license information: Public file; LMS
- Webcast: Listen Live
- Website: kwav.com

KWAV (96.9 FM "K-Wave 96.9") is a commercial radio station in Monterey, California, broadcasting to the Salinas–Monterey–Santa Cruz region of Central California. It is owned by Stephens Media Group and it broadcasts an adult contemporary radio format. For much of November and December, it switches to Christmas music. The radio studios and offices are on Garden Court in Monterey. In the evening, KWAV carries the nationally syndicated Delilah call-in and request show.

KWAV has an effective radiated power (ERP) of 18,000 watts. The transmitter is located on Rana Creek Road, atop Mount Toro, in Carmel Valley, California. KWAV is a Class B FM station with a higher power than would be granted under the present U.S. Federal Communications Commission rules. It is often referred as a "Superpower" Grandfathered Class B.

== History ==
On October 14, 1961, the station signed on as KHFR. The call sign stood for "Ken's Hi Fi Radio". From 1966 to 1968, the station held the callsign KMBY-FM, as a sister station to KMBY (1240 AM). Beginning in 1969, the station's call sign became KWAV. It aired an easy listening format, which evolved into the AC format in the first quarter of the 1980s.

In the mid-1990s, KWAV's slogan was "Today's Hits, Yesterday's Favorites." The Adult Contemporary music mix was upbeat, featuring an R&B-leaning playlist with Cher, Mariah Carey, Gloria Estefan, Janet Jackson, Whitney Houston, Paula Abdul, The Pointer Sisters, Vanessa Williams, Brian McKnight, Lionel Richie, Stevie Wonder, Michael Jackson, Madonna, Smokey Robinson, Timmy T, Stevie B, Expose, and Ace of Base as core artists. Other core artists included Amy Grant, Bryan Adams, Rod Stewart, Sting, Michael Bolton, Billy Joel, Richard Marx, Paul Young, Restless Heart, Don Hensley, Foreigner, Bonnie Raitt, Bruce Hornsby, Huey Lewis, Heart, Roxette, Basia, and Swingout Sister. Also included were numerous pop/alternative crossover tracks by Melissa Etheridge, Duran Duran, Carrie Underwood, Lisa Loeb, Hootie & The Blowfish, Meatloaf, and Dionne Farris. By early 1996, the music mix became very upbeat - almost Hot Adult Contemporary in nature - and included songs by Blues Traveler, Gin Blossoms and The Cranberries.

In February 1996, the station revamped its image, becoming "Soft Rock Favorites" and flipped to Soft AC, which is workplace-oriented.

In March 1999, the station dropped its "Love Songs Til Midnight" all-request call-in program in favor of the nationally syndicated Delilah program. "LSTM" host Candy James subsequently moved to middays.

From 2000 to 2005, the station's music mix included numerous R&B oldies by Al Green, The Supremes, The Spinners, and the Four Tops.

In 2003, local TV personality Barry Brown and Karen Hamilton joined as hosts of the morning program.

In 2005, the station shifted its playlist to include fewer oldies and more of the upbeat 1980s and 1990s R&B-leaning tracks it used to play in the mid-1990s. The station also began adding 1970s-era R&B/disco tracks by artists such as Earth Wind & Fire, Diana Ross, Gloria Gaynor, and The Beegees. The branding remains "Soft Rock Favorites."

In 2007, the station began to broadcast in HD Radio. Its HD3 digital subchannel rebroadcasts the Internet radio station smoothjazz.com.

In 2014, owner Buckley Broadcasting sold KWAV to Mapleton Communications. The deal, at a purchase price of $2.15 million, was completed on September 5, 2014.

On July 1, 2019, Mapleton Communications announced its intent to sell its remaining 37 stations to Stephens Media Group. Stephens began operating the station that same day. The sale was consummated on September 30, 2019.

== 1983 studio shooting ==
On October 21, 1983, Sandy Shore, the disc jockey for KWAV, was set to play "Who Can It Be Now?" by Men At Work after finishing off Cliff Richard's "Never Say Die (Give a Little Bit More)", until the station immediately went off the air for three hours after a man with a 12-gauge shotgun entered the KWAV building and fired 58 shots into the studio equipment, destroying the station's equipment and the Cliff Richard record, causing an estimate $200,000 in damage. The suspect was identified as 41-year-old Norbert Shenk, a resident of Scotts Valley, California, just outside Santa Cruz. Nobody was reported killed or injured, as Shore thought that Norbert was going to kill himself.

In court, Norbert entered no plea when he was arraigned for felony charges of vandalism, burglary, and discharging a firearm at a public place a day after the shooting. Monterey Police according to Radio & Records said that Norbert had broken into KWAV's studio during early morning hours in order to avoid hurting anyone. Norbert was ordered to undergo psychiatric tests while being held in jail in lieu of a $100,000 bail. In January 1984, court reconvened and the judge ruled that Norbert was deemed mentally unfit. He was then transported to Atascadero State Hospital in Atascadero for treatment.

== Former DJs ==
Vic Johnson, Bob March, Teddy Greene, Michael Redding, Jerry Connelly, John Van Camp, Dean Knox, Greg Dean, Jeff Powers, Dennis Miller, Bo Woods, Alan Richmond, Sandy Shore, John Garabo, Gary Russell, Sebastian Thomas, Debi McCallister (now at KQFC in Boise, Idaho), Jack Peterson, Jane Grigsby (Jane Holladay) and the team of Barry Brown, Jay Peterson and Karen Hamilton. Afternoon drive and Production Director Gary Summers.
