= KABX-FM =

Radio station in Merced, California

- Merced, California; United States
- Broadcast area: California Central Valley
- Frequency: 97.5 MHz
- Branding: K 97.5

Programming
- Format: Adult contemporary

Ownership
- Owner: Stephens Media Group; (SMG-Merced, LLC)
- Sister stations: KBRE, KHTN, KLOQ-FM, KUBB, KYOS

History
- First air date: December 18, 1975
- Former call signs: KMYT (1975–1989)

Technical information
- Licensing authority: FCC
- Facility ID: 41173
- Class: B
- ERP: 8,800 watts
- HAAT: 354 meters (1,161 ft)
- Transmitter coordinates: 37°26′44″N 120°8′37″W

Links
- Public license information: Public file; LMS
- Webcast: Listen live
- Website: 975kabx.com

KABX-FM (97.5 FM, "K97.5") is a commercial radio station licensed to Merced, California, United States. Owned by Stephens Media Group, through licensee SMG-Merced, LLC, KABX-FM airs an adult contemporary format. Its studios are on West 19th Street in Merced.

KABX's transmitter is located on Shultz Mountain, off California State Route 140 in Catheys Valley. KABX-FM can be heard over a large part of California's Central Valley, from Modesto to Fresno.

== History ==
=== Beautiful Music and Adult Contemporary ===
The station signed on the air on December 18, 1975, as KMYT, airing an automated beautiful music format. It was the FM sister station to KYOS 1480 AM. The studios were at the KYOS transmitter site.

The station broadcast in FM stereo and it used the slogan "K-Might, The Mighty Sounds of Stereo." At the end of 1999, the station's tower was relocated to Shultz Mountain in Catheys Valley to improve its signal coverage. Over the years, it added more vocals, eventually making the transition to soft adult contemporary.

On August 27, 2011, KABX-FM adjusted its format and became mainstream adult contemporary as "The New K 97.5--Favorites of Yesterday and Today." Under the guidance of AC programming consultant Gary Berkowitz, the station used JAM jingles and voiceovers from Jim Merkel. It was owned by Mapleton Communications, with stations in California, Oregon and Washington state.

=== Acquisition by Stephens Media ===
On July 1, 2019, Mapleton Communications announced its intent to sell its remaining 37 stations to the Stephens Media Group. Stephens began operating the station that same day under a local marketing agreement (LMA).

The sale was consummated on September 30, 2019. The price tag was $21 million.

== Previous logo ==
(KABX's logo under previous "Oldies 97.5" branding)
