= KXLY (AM) =

- Spokane, Washington; United States
- Broadcast area: Spokane metropolitan area–Eastern Washington
- Frequency: 920 kHz
- Branding: 920 News Now

Programming
- Format: News/talk
- Network: ABC News Radio
- Affiliations: Bloomberg Radio; Compass Media Networks; Westwood One; Seattle Mariners Radio Network; Washington State Cougars (football and men's basketball)

Ownership
- Owner: Morgan Murphy Media; (QueenB Radio, Inc.)
- Sister stations: KEZE; KHTQ; KXLX; KXLY-FM; KXLY-TV; KXMN-LD; KVNI; KZZU-FM

History
- First air date: October 18, 1922
- Former call signs: KFDC (1922–1923); KFPY (1924–1946)
- Call sign meaning: The XL Network (The radio station was a flagship for a regional network)

Technical information
- Licensing authority: FCC
- Facility ID: 61947
- Class: B
- Power: 25,000 watts (day); 5,400 watts (night)
- Transmitter coordinates: 47°36′29.8″N 117°22′24.1″W
- Translator: 100.7 K264CH (Spokane)

Links
- Public license information: Public file; LMS
- Webcast: Listen live
- Website: kxly920.com

KXLY (920 kHz) is a commercial AM radio station in Spokane, Washington. It broadcasts a news/talk radio format with the branding "920 News Now". The station is owned by Morgan Murphy Media, with its license held by QueenB Radio, Inc. Its studios and offices are on West Boone Avenue in Spokane.

KXLY uses a non-directional antenna, from a transmitter site off South Regal Street in Spokane. By day, it operates with a power of 25,000 watts, which is reduced to 5,400 watts at night to protect other stations on 920 AM from interference. Programming is also carried on 250-watt FM translator K264CH at 100.7 MHz.

== Programming ==
Weekdays on KXLY begin with a simulcast of co-owned KXLY-TV's morning newscast, Good Morning Northwest. The rest of the weekday schedule is made up of nationally syndicated shows: Markley, Van Camp and Robbins, The Ramsey Show with Dave Ramsey, The Erick Erickson Show, The Lars Larson Show, The Mark Levin Show, and Bloomberg Radio. Weekends feature shows on money, health, home improvement, technology and the outdoors.

KXLY is the flagship station of The Cougar Sports Radio Network, which carries Washington State Cougars football and men's basketball games. It is also the alternate affiliate of Seattle Mariners Radio Network baseball. KXLY has a news sharing arrangement with co-owned KXLY-TV and also carries updates from ABC News Radio.

== History ==
=== Early years ===
From 1912 to 1927, radio communication in the United States was regulated by the U.S. Department of Commerce. In the early days, there were no formal requirements for stations, most of which operated under Amateur and Experimental licenses, making broadcasts intended for the general public. To provide a common standard, the department issued a regulation effective December 1, 1921, requiring that broadcasting stations would have to hold a "Limited Commercial License" that authorized operation on two designated broadcasting wavelengths: 360 meters (833 kHz) for "entertainment", and 485 meters (619 kHz) for "market and weather reports".

The first two broadcasting station authorizations in Spokane, Washington, were issued to the Doerr-Mitchell Electric Company's KFZ on March 23, 1922, (Note: KFZ was deleted on September 8, 1923.) and to the Spokane Chronicle's KOE on April 12, 1922. (Note: KOE was deleted on October 7, 1922.) Both stations shared time on 360 meters, and because there was only the single entertainment wavelength, stations in a given region had to develop arrangements for broadcasts on the common wavelength.

=== KFDC ===
In 1922, 17-year-old Edmund B. Craney was an employee at the Radio Supply Company in Spokane, which was owned by Thomas W. Symons, Jr. Craney was a member of the North Central High School radio club. In the summer of 1921, physics teacher Arthur L. Smith had arranged for the school to be issued a "Technical and Training School" station license, with the call sign 7YL. (Note: The "7" in the call sign indicated that the station was located in the 7th Radio Inspection district, while the "Y" reflected that it was a Technical and Training School authorization.) In addition, Craney held a license for amateur station 7AEG. (Note: The fact that the "A" in 7AEG's call sign fell in the range A-W indicated that the station was operating under a standard Amateur radio license.)

Craney convinced his employer that the Radio Supply Company should operate a broadcasting station, to promote sales. The December 1, 1921, regulations that had established the broadcasting service required that station operators had to hold a "commercial second-class license or higher". Craney arranged to take the training for the needed qualification. On November 21, 1922, a broadcasting station license with the call sign KFDC was issued in the name of "Radio Supply Co. (E. B. Craney)." It would also operate on 360 meters.

Craney reported that broadcasts originating from Radio Supply started on October 18, 1922. The KFDC call letters were randomly assigned from an alphabetical roster of available call signs. The station's history makes it the oldest surviving Spokane radio station. (Note: KHQ, now KQNT, was first licensed earlier, on February 28, 1922, but did not move to Spokane until 1925. KFIO (now KSBN), first licensed on May 22, 1923, has a slightly longer continuous history, because unlike KXLY it was never deleted and relicensed.)

Although initially licensed to broadcast on 360 meters, Craney later reported that technical issues meant that the station had difficulty maintaining its assigned wavelength. In mid-1923 KFDC was reassigned to 1060 kHz.

=== Deletion and revival as KFPY ===
KFDC suspended operations and was deleted on September 19, 1923. However, the station was revived the next year, and was relicensed on April 23, 1924, to the Symons Investment Company, again on 1060 kHz. It got the sequentially assigned call letters of KFPY. KFPY was housed in the Symons Building on 7 South Howard Street in Spokane. The station went on the air on May 10, 1924. Beginning in 1925, audience members were welcomed to view live broadcasts, usually music programs or dramas. They took place at "The Golden Concert Studios of KFPY" on the second floor, which boasted a curtain, a stage and seating for 150. On the stage were two grand pianos and a Wurlitzer Organ. It was through these facilities that Bing Crosby, then an unknown Gonzaga University student, made his radio debut. Decades later, Crosby would partner with the station to launch KXLY-TV. Other future stars who performed at the Golden Studios include Bob Crosby and Patrice Munsel.

KFPY was reported to be transmitting on 1100 kHz as of December 31, 1926. In mid-1927, this was changed to 1220 kHz. On November 11, 1928, under the provisions of the Federal Radio Commission's General Order 40, KFPY was assigned to 1390 kHz on a timesharing basis with KWSC in Pullman, Washington. This was changed to unlimited hours on 1340 kHz in August 1929. In 1935 the station moved to 890 kHz.

In 1929, KFPY became Spokane's affiliate for the CBS Radio Network. During the "Golden Age of Radio", the station carried CBS's dramas, comedies, news, sports, soap operas, game shows and big band broadcasts. In March 1941, stations on 890 kHz were moved to KXLY's current frequency of 920 kHz, as part of the implementation of the North American Regional Broadcasting Agreement (NARBA).

=== KXLY ===
Craney left KFPY in 1927 to found KGIR in Butte, Montana. He returned to Spokane in 1945 to buy KFPY, which was renamed to KXLY on December 19, 1946. The new call letters were part of a larger renaming of stations associated with Craney's Pacific Northwest Broadcasters group to all feature call signs beginning with "KXL". (Note: The other stations in the group were KXL in Portland, Oregon; KXLF (formerly KGIR) in Butte; KXLJ (formerly KPFA) in Helena, Montana; KXLQ (formerly KRBM) in Bozeman, Montana; KXLE (formerly KCOW) in Ellensburg, Washington; KXLK in Great Falls, Montana, and KXLL in Missoula, Montana.)

On February 22, 1953, the radio station expanded into television with the sign-on of KXLY-TV on channel 4. Like its radio cousin, the TV station was an affiliate of the CBS television network. That November, Craney sold KXLY and KXLY-TV to the Northern Pacific Radio and Television Corporation, headed by Joseph Harris, Norman Eisenstein, and Richard E. Jones.

In September 1959, an FM station was added, KXLY-FM 99.9. At first, KXLY AM and FM simulcast their programming. But by the early 1960s, KXLY-FM had its own format, beautiful music. In 1961, Northern Pacific sold KXLY-AM-FM-TV to Morgan Murphy Media.

In September 1998, the CBS Radio Network affiliation moved to KGA. KXLY picked up ABC News Radio, matching its television counterpart's affiliation, which had itself switched from CBS to ABC in 1976 after CBS ended its affiliation with KXLY-TV.

On September 17, 2015, KXLY added an FM translator on 100.3 MHz. In April 2016, the translator moved to 100.7 FM.
