= KXLY-TV =

Television station in Spokane, Washington

KXLY-TV and KXMN-LD

Spokane, Washington; Coeur d'Alene, Idaho; United States
- Channels for KXLY-TV: Digital: 13 (VHF); Virtual: 4
- Channels for KXMN-LD: Digital: 9 (VHF); Virtual: 4
- Branding: 4 News Now

Programming
- Affiliations: 4.1: ABC; 4.2: MeTV; for others, see § Subchannels

Ownership
- Owner: Morgan Murphy Media; (Spokane Television, Inc.)
- Sister stations: TV: KAYU-TV; Radio: KEZE; KHTQ; KXLX; KXLY; KXLY-FM; KVNI; KZZU-FM

History
- First air date: KXLY-TV: February 22, 1953 (Note: The Broadcasting and Cable Yearbook says February 22, while the Television and Cable Factbook says January 16.); KXMN-LD: September 5, 2006 (as a separately-run station)
- Former call signs: KXMN-LD: K09FZ (until 2005); K11VT (2005); KUUP-LP (2005–2006)
- Former channel number: KXLY-TV: Analog: 4 (VHF, 1953–2009)
- Former affiliations: KXLY-TV: CBS (1953–1976); ABC (secondary, 1953–1954 and February–July 1976); DuMont (secondary, 1953–1955); UPN (secondary, January–September 2006); MyNetworkTV (4.2, 2009–2012); KXMN-LD: KXLY-TV repeater (analog, until 2006); MyNetworkTV (analog 2006–2009; 4.2 2009–2012)
- Call sign meaning: KXLY-TV: The XL Network (KXLY (AM) was a flagship station for a regional network); KXMN-LD: KXLY MyNetworkTV (previous affiliation)

Technical information
- Licensing authority: FCC
- Facility ID: KXLY-TV: 61978; KXMN-LD: 167856
- ERP: KXLY-TV: 23.3 kW; KXMN-LD: 0.2 kW
- HAAT: KXLY-TV: 936 m (3,071 ft); KXMN-LD: 534.8 m (1,755 ft)
- Transmitter coordinates: KXLY-TV: 47°55′18″N 117°6′52″W; KXMN-LD: 47°34′34″N 117°18′2″W
- Translators: K19NN-D 19 Moses Lake; (for others, see § Translators)

Links
- Public license information: KXLY-TV: Public file; LMS; KXMN-LD: Public file; LMS
- Website: www.kxly.com

KXLY-TV (channel 4) is a television station in Spokane, Washington, United States, affiliated with ABC and owned by Morgan Murphy Media, which is co-managed with Fox/MyNetworkTV affiliate KAYU-TV (channel 28). Its studios are located at the KXLY Broadcast Center on West Boone Avenue in Spokane, and its transmitter sits atop Mount Spokane. The station's MeTV-affiliated second digital subchannel is also seen in the Yakima–Tri-Cities market on sister stations and fellow ABC affiliates KAPP (channel 35.2) and KVEW (channel 42.2).

KXLY-TV is also carried on cable systems in Calgary and Edmonton, Alberta, Canada, both of which are double the size of the station's American coverage area. One result of this is that stations in Calgary and Edmonton air American shows on Pacific Time, even though Calgary and Edmonton are both on Mountain Time. KXLY-TV is one of five local Spokane area television stations seen in Canada on the Shaw Direct satellite service. It can also be seen on local cable systems in eastern British Columbia.

== History ==
KXLY-TV logo (1966)

Although Spokane radio stations KHQ and KXLY (920 AM) were both granted authorization by the Federal Communications Commission (FCC) to build television stations on July 11, 1952, KXLY-TV was the second to sign on, going on the air with broadcast tests on January 16, 1953, and regular programming beginning on February 22. KXLY had initially hoped to have its television station on the air by Christmas of 1952, but adverse weather conditions on Mount Spokane delayed the launch. The KXLY stations were owned by northwestern broadcast pioneer Ed Craney; just a few months after channel 4 signed on, Craney sold KXLY-AM-TV to Northern Pacific Radio and Television Corporation.

KXLY-TV was a primary CBS affiliate owing to its sister radio station's long affiliation with CBS Radio sharing ABC with KHQ-TV. Channel 4 also carried some programming from DuMont until as late as April 1955. ABC programming, along with partial DuMont shows that KXLY-TV did not carry, moved to KREM when it signed on in 1954.

At first, channel 4 enjoyed a good partnership with CBS. The network worked well with early KXLY executives Dick Jones, Bob Struble, and James Agostino to help the station become a dominant player in the Spokane television market in the 1950s and 1960s. Morgan Murphy bought the station in 1961.

However, the station's relationship with CBS faltered in later years when it started airing several network shows out of pattern. On February 19, 1976, CBS sent KXLY-TV a "notice of termination", with CBS spokesman Barry Richardson stating that the network was ending its 23-year association with KXLY-TV "because we made a business judgment that we could get wider exposure for our programs with another station". This would become a rare first in which a major television network would strip a station of its affiliation without first announcing a new affiliate. On August 8, the affiliation switch went into full effect, with CBS programming moving to KREM (KREM wanted to wait until ABC finished airing the network's coverage of the 1976 Summer Olympics to make the switch). KXLY then picked up KREM's old ABC affiliation, although it began the transition in February 1976 when it began airing the then-new Good Morning America while airing CBS shows throughout the day. The affiliation change coincided with ABC's rise to number one in the ratings, where it would remain for the next several years. This meant KXLY ended up broadcasting the highest-rated networks (first CBS, then ABC) throughout the 1970s. Its radio sister remained with CBS for another 22 years until September 1998, at which time it became an ABC Radio Network affiliate, like its TV cousin.

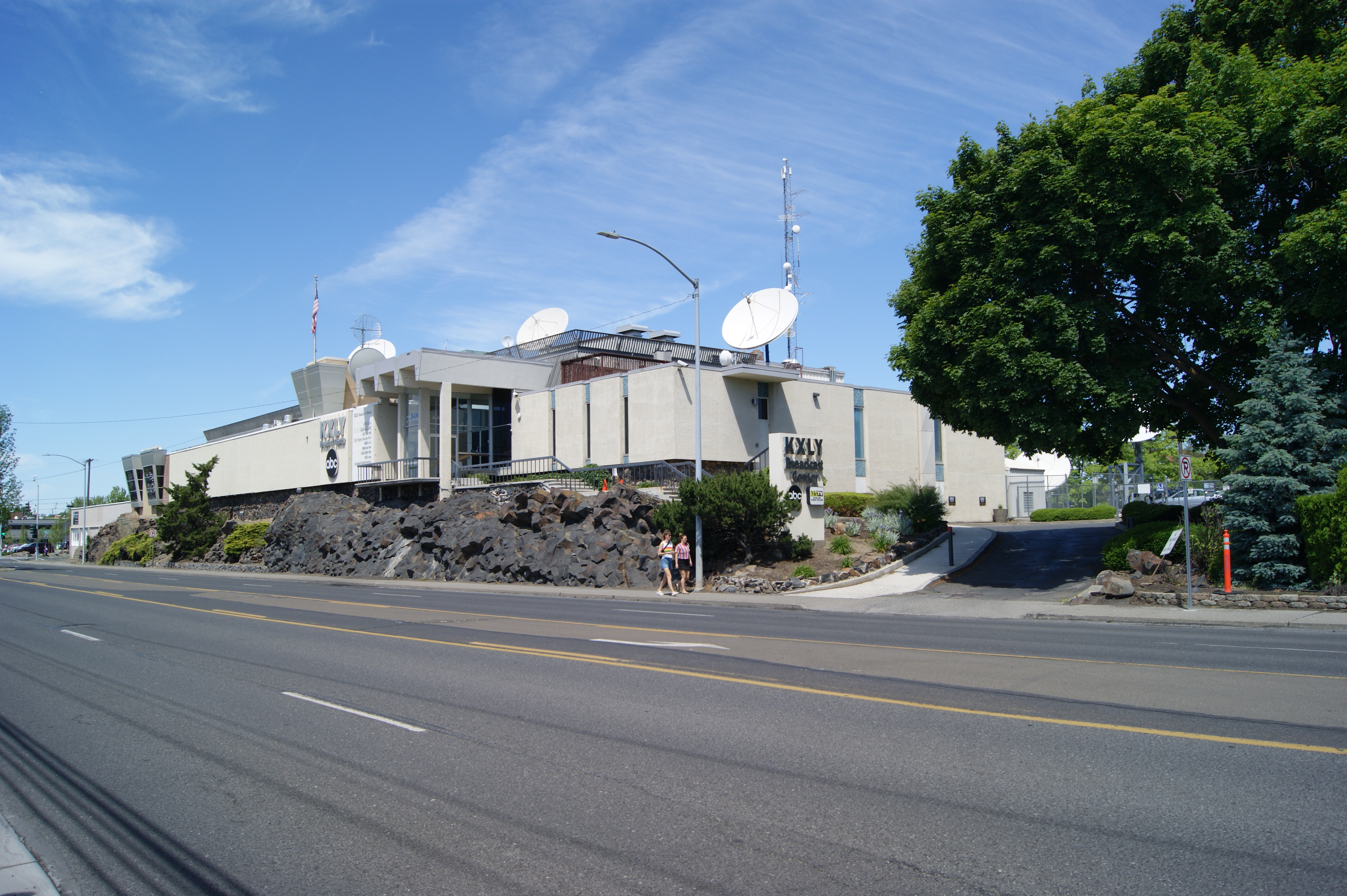
KXLY Broadcast Center on Boone Avenue

KXLY-TV is the only station in the Spokane market to broadcast from Mount Spokane, to the northeast of the city. The site (located in a state park) was originally developed with the expectation that Spokane's other TV stations would want to follow suit. When this did not occur, KXLY built a translator (K09FZ on channel 9, later becoming K11VT channel 11, then KUUP-LP) to serve non-antenna-rotator-equipped households from the mountain ridge south of Spokane used by the other stations. On May 24, 2006, it became KXMN-LP and from September 5, 2006, until the national DTV transition in February 2009, it broadcast MyNetworkTV programming. From the digital transition date forward, the South Hill transmitter rebroadcast KXLY-TV—both in analog on VHF channel 11 and as 4.1 (ABC HD) and 4.2 (MyNetworkTV/MeTV) over a VHF channel 9 digital translator. In June 2017, KXLY-TV added channel 22, a 15,000 watt fill-in transmitter atop Krell Ridge on Spokane's South Hill. This new digital signal adds stronger service for Spokane's Downtown, Northside, South Hill and Spokane River Valley antenna household locations.

Programming from MeTV was added on September 3, 2012. KXLY-DT2 stopped carrying MyNetworkTV on October 1 and has since carried MeTV exclusively.

=== HD race ===
On March 11, 1999, KXLY-DT signed on the air as Eastern Washington's first digital television signal on VHF channel 13. Much like the first black and white television broadcasters, this initial effort was launched utilizing a low power digital transmitter and antenna co-located at the Boone Avenue studio location in downtown Spokane. The station's first authentic telecasts began with its 5 p.m. and 6 p.m. newscasts March 26, 1999.

Later behind the scenes that year, engineers assembled the new ABC High Definition satellite equipment to ready the station for ABC's foray into HD with Monday Night Football. By September 27, 1999, KXLY-DT had permanently moved its digital transmissions to the top of Mount Spokane and increased its power to the FCC maximum of 23,300 watts. That evening marked the region's first broadcast of HD pictures with the airing of Monday Night Football.

On April 20, 2006, the race to HD live local newscasts in the Spokane television market began when KXLY-TV became the first station in Eastern Washington to broadcast a local news segment in HD, an experiment the station continued to explore by showing one pre-taped news segment in HD each Tuesday night during its 6 p.m. broadcast until it switched to showing full HD newscasts on August 3, 2008.

On May 16, 2008, KHQ announced it would begin to offer high definition newscasts on August 8, 2008, promoting the start date for months. KXLY then leapfrogged KHQ's challenge to be the first HD news operation in the market, doing so on August 3, five days before KHQ's announced launch date.

== News operation ==
Logo for "4 News Now"

KXLY broadcasts 33 hours of news a week, with a two-hour morning program, Good Morning Northwest, from 5 to 7 a.m., and its evening newscasts at 5, 6, 6:30 and 11 p.m. Unlike most ABC affiliates in the Pacific time zone, KXLY does not produce an 11 p.m. newscast on Saturdays, leaving the 5 and 6 p.m. newscasts as KXLY's only news offerings on that day. In 2024, KXLY added midday and 4 p.m newscasts from "KXLY+" on the main channel.

On December 22, 2008, KXLY began producing high-resolution weather segments for sister stations KAPP in Yakima and KVEW in Kennewick. Both stations discontinued their 6 p.m. newscasts, the 11 p.m. newscasts were reduced to five minutes and weekend newscasts are now produced at KXLY. This includes all weather and sports reports for weekdays and weekends. In addition to these moves, 17 employees from KVEW and KAPP were laid off.

On July 1, 2019, KXLY rebranded its news operation as 4 News Now, and introduced a new studio replacing the one that had been used for two decades. Both the branding and studio were based on designs introduced by sister station and Morgan Murphy flagship WISC-TV in Madison, Wisconsin, earlier in the year.

=== Notable former on-air staff ===
- Richard Brown – weeknight evening news anchor (1998–2007)
- Donna Kelley – anchor, reporter, and producer (1982–1985)
- Nadine Woodward – weeknight evening news anchor (2010–2019)

== Technical information ==
=== Subchannels ===
The station's signal is multiplexed:

Subchannels of KXLY-TV
Subchannel	Res.	Short name	Programming
4.1	720p	KXLY-HD	ABC
4.2	720p	KXLY4.2	MeTV
4.3	480i	KXLY4.3	Heroes & Icons
4.4	480i	KXLY4.4	Start TV
4.5	480i	KXLY4.5	Dabl
4.6	480i	KXLY4.6	QVC
4.7	480i	KXLY4.7	HSN

=== Analog-to-digital conversion ===
KXLY-TV ended regular programming on its analog signal, over VHF channel 4, on February 17, 2009, the original target date when full-power television stations in the United States were to transition from analog to digital broadcasts under federal mandate (which was later pushed back to June 12, 2009). The station's digital signal remained on its pre-transition VHF channel 13, using virtual channel 4.

=== Translators ===
- K11HM-D Bonners Ferry, ID
- K14SF-D Brewster
- K31QK-D Coeur d'Alene, ID
- K10KR-D Coolin, ID
- K10LG-D Dryden
- K16LS-D Grangeville, ID
- K06QF-D Heron, MT
- K09DF-D Juliaetta, ID
- K30PT-D Kalispell & Lakeside, MT
- K05MU-D Leavenworth
- K23NQ-D Lewiston, ID
- K24KJ-D Libby, MT
- K08CW-D Malott–Wakefield
- K19JC-D Mazama
- K33NM-D Omak
- K35MN-D Omak
- K07QH-D Plains & Paradise, MT
- K03DJ-D Polson, MT
- K10DM-D Riverside
- KXMN-LD 9 Spokane
- KXLY-TV (DRT) 22 Spokane
- K08CX-D Tonasket
- K10QH-D Trout Creek, etc., MT
- K11KP-D Troy, MT
- K26IV-D Wenatchee
- K30KA-D Wenatchee
- K12BA-D Winthrop–Twisp
