= KBRE =

Radio station in Merced, California

- Merced, California; United States
- Broadcast area: Merced metropolitan area
- Frequency: 1660 kHz
- Branding: 105.7 The Bear

Programming
- Format: Active and alternative rock
- Affiliations: Compass Media Networks

Ownership
- Owner: Stephens Media Group; (SMG-Merced, LLC)
- Sister stations: KABX-FM, KHTN, KLOQ-FM, KUBB, KYOS

History
- First air date: May 2000
- Former call signs: KAXW (1998–2002); KTIQ (2002–2016)
- Call sign meaning: Bear

Technical information
- Licensing authority: FCC
- Facility ID: 87180
- Class: B
- Power: 10,000 watts (day); 1,000 watts (night)
- Transmitter coordinates: 37°16′40.8″N 120°37′38.7″W
- Translator: 105.7 K289CB (Los Banos)

Links
- Public license information: Public file; LMS
- Webcast: Listen live
- Website: 1057thebear.com

KBRE (1660 AM) is a commercial radio station licensed to Merced, California, United States. It is owned by the Stephens Media Group, through licensee SMG-Merced, LLC. It plays a mix of active and alternative rock, calling itself "105.7 The Bear". Programming is also heard on low-power FM translator K289CB (105.7 FM) in nearby Los Banos.

KBRE's transmitter is sited off South Bert Crane Road in Atwater.

== History ==
KBRE began as the "expanded band" twin to a station on the standard AM band. On March 17, 1997, the Federal Communications Commission (FCC) announced that eighty-eight stations had been given permission to move to newly available "expanded band" transmitting frequencies, ranging from 1610 to 1700 kHz, with then-KLOQ in Merced authorized to move from 1580 kHz to 1660 kHz.

The FCC's initial policy was that both the original station and its expanded band counterpart could operate simultaneously for up to five years, after which owners would have to turn in one of the two licenses, depending on whether they preferred the new assignment or elected to remain on the original frequency. It was decided to shut down the standard band station, and on August 13, 2004, the license for original station, now KVVY, on 1580 kHz was cancelled.

A construction permit for the expanded band station was assigned the call letters KAXW on January 9, 1998. The station signed on the air in May 2000. It was owned by Clarke Broadcasting and aired a spanish-language adult contemporary format.

=== Sports radio ===
On February 12, 2002, the station changed its call sign to KTIQ. It continued to carry a sports format, known as "The Ticket" (indicated by the letters "TIQ"). In late 2007/early 2008, the station switched to Spanish-language Christian radio as "Amistad Christiana".

=== Switch to rock ===
On March 16, 2016, 92.5 KBRE's old active/alternative rock format moved to AM 1660, calling itself "105.7 The Bear". It added FM translator K289CB Los Banos. The station changed its call sign to KBRE on May 11, 2016.

=== Acquisition by Stephens Media ===
On July 1, 2019, Mapleton Communications announced its intent to sell its remaining 37 stations to Stephens Media Group. Stephens began operating the station that same day. The sale was consummated on September 30, 2019 at a price of $21 million.
