= KXLE-FM =

- Ellensburg, Washington; United States
- Frequency: 95.3 MHz
- Branding: Country That Still Kicks

Programming
- Format: Country

Ownership
- Owner: Ellensburg Radio Broadcasting, LLC
- Sister stations: KXLE

History
- First air date: 1972

Technical information
- Licensing authority: FCC
- Facility ID: 35957
- Class: C3
- ERP: 1,700 watts
- HAAT: 380 meters (1,250 ft)
- Transmitter coordinates: 46°53′14.2″N 120°26′33.2″W

Links
- Public license information: Public file; LMS
- Webcast: Listen live
- Website: www.kxleradio.com

KXLE-FM is a radio station located in Ellensburg, Washington, United States, operating on a frequency of 95.3 MHz. The programming format of the station is country music, with a core focus of music from the 90's through the early 2010's, with current Top 20 mainstream songs worked in throughout the hour.

KXLE-FM was originally a Top 40 CHR station before making the switch to country and has been a country format station since the late 1980's. In January 2024, the station switched to Local Radio Networks (LRN) for their music programming under LRN's Top 40 "Mainstream Country" format before switching to "Superstar Country" in March 2026. As part of their re-imaging in June 2026, the station pivoted their slogan to "Country That Still Kicks", a throwback to the station's original branding of "Country That Kicks", implemented originally after the format flip from CHR to country.

The station was owned by the Tacher family until 2023 when it sold to Ellensburg Radio Broadcasting, LLC, which is currently owned by William Wolfenbarger, a longtime broadcaster, and Henry Johnston, a local business owner in Kittitas County.

The new ownership has taken steps to improve the station's signal and programming, including a studio move in May of 2026 from their longstanding location on the Vantage Highway to new studios located in downtown Ellensburg.

The station features longtime morning show host, Steve Scellick, as its "Big Voice" for imaging. Scellick worked at KXLE-FM for nearly 30 years, hosting the FM morning show, before retiring on December 24, 2020.

== Morning Show ==
On Monday, June 22, 2026, the station launched a new local morning show called the "KXLE Morning Rodeo", hosted by Henry Johnston (air name "Henry J.") one of the partners in Ellensburg Radio Broadcasting and local business owner. The show is simulcast weekdays from 6:00 a.m. until 9:00 a.m. on both KXLE-FM and sister station, KXLE-AM 1240 and features a variety of country music separate from the usual programming, along with local news, weather, sports and community updates.
