= KXLE (AM) =

News/talk radio station in Ellensburg, Washington, United States

- Ellensburg, Washington; United States
- Frequency: 1240 kHz
- Branding: Classic Country 1240

Programming
- Format: Classic country
- Affiliations: LRN

Ownership
- Owner: Ellensburg Radio Broadcasting, LLC
- Sister stations: KXLE-FM

History
- First air date: July 19, 1946
- Former call signs: KCOW (1946)

Technical information
- Licensing authority: FCC
- Facility ID: 35958
- Class: C
- Power: 1,000 watts day; 1,000 watts night
- Transmitter coordinates: 47°0′8.45″N 120°31′35.25″W

Links
- Public license information: Public file; LMS

KXLE is a radio station located in Ellensburg, Washington, United States, operating on a frequency of 1240 kHz with a power of 1,000 watts. The AM transmitter tower is located at the station's former offices at 1311 Vantage Highway in Ellensburg. As of January 2024, the programming format of the station is classic country, The station is owned by Ellensburg Radio Broadcasting, LLC.

== History ==
The station signed on July 19, 1946 as KCOW. It changed its call letters to KXLE on November 27, 1946. At the time, the station was part of the Pacific Northwest Broadcasters, a group of stations owned in whole or in part by Ed Craney that also included KXLY in Spokane, KXL in Portland, Oregon, KXLF in Butte, Montana, KXLJ in Helena, Montana, KXLQ in Bozeman, Montana, KXLK in Great Falls, Montana, and KXLL in Missoula, Montana; other than KXL, and the newly-launched KXLK and KXLL, the other stations also concurrently changed their call letters to incorporate the letters "XL".

The station's previous owner, KXLE, Inc. was owned by Sol M. Tacher of Bellevue, Washington, and his son. In 2023, the Tachers sold KXLE and KXLE-FM to Ellensburg Radio Broadcasting for $250,000; at the time of the sale, KXLE had a news/talk format.

In January 2024, the station switched from news/talk to Local Radio Networks (LRN) for their music programming.

Ellensburg Radio Broadcasting, LLC, is currently owned by William Wolfenbarger, a longtime broadcaster, and Henry Johnston, a local business owner in Kittitas County. The new ownership has taken steps to improve the station's signal and programming, including a studio move in May of 2026 from their longstanding location on the Vantage Highway to new studios located in downtown Ellensburg.

== Morning Show ==
On Monday, June 22, 2026, the station launched a new local morning show called the "KXLE Morning Rodeo", hosted by Henry Johnston (air name "Henry J.") one of the partners in Ellensburg Radio Broadcasting and local business owner. The show is simulcast weekdays from 6:00 a.m. until 9:00 a.m. on both KXLE-AM and sister station, KXLE-FM 95.3 and features a variety of country music separate from the usual programming, along with local news, weather, sports and community updates.
