= KLOQ-FM =

Radio station in Winton, California

- Winton, California; United States
- Broadcast area: Merced, California
- Frequency: 98.7 MHz
- Branding: Radio Lobo 98.7

Programming
- Format: Regional Mexican

Ownership
- Owner: Stephens Media Group; (SMG-Merced, LLC)
- Sister stations: KABX-FM, KBRE, KHTN, KUBB, KYOS

History
- First air date: 1996
- Former call signs: KEAL (1989–1991); KFMK (1991–1996)

Technical information
- Licensing authority: FCC
- Facility ID: 65374
- Class: A
- ERP: 6,000 watts
- HAAT: 91 meters (299 ft)
- Transmitter coordinates: 37°16′41″N 120°37′35″W

Links
- Public license information: Public file; LMS
- Webcast: Listen live
- Website: radiolobo987.com

KLOQ-FM (98.7 FM, "Radio Lobo 98.7") is a radio station broadcasting a Regional Mexican format. Licensed to Winton, California, United States, it serves the Merced, California, area. The station is owned by Stephens Media Group, through licensee SMG-Merced, LLC. Its studios are in Merced and its transmitter is located west of Merced.

== History ==
This station signed on in 1996. It was acquired by Mapleton Communications in 2002.

On July 1, 2019, Mapleton Communications announced its intent to sell its remaining 37 stations to Stephens Media Group. Stephens began operating the station that same day. The sale was consummated on September 30, 2019, at a price of $21 million.
