= KBBD =

Radio station in Spokane, Washington

- Spokane, Washington; United States
- Broadcast area: Spokane metropolitan area - Eastern Washington
- Frequency: 103.9 MHz
- Branding: 103.9 Bob-FM

Programming
- Format: Adult hits

Ownership
- Owner: Stephens Media Group; (SMG-Spokane, LLC)
- Sister stations: KDRK-FM, KEYF-FM, KGA, KJRB, KZBD

History
- First air date: October 6, 1986
- Former call signs: KXVO (1984–1985, CP); KVXO (1985–1993); KNJY (1993–1999); KWHK (1999–2001); KYWL (2001–2004); KBDB-FM (2004–2005)
- Call sign meaning: Bob-FM (branding)

Technical information
- Licensing authority: FCC
- Facility ID: 36488
- Class: C1
- ERP: 34,000 watts
- HAAT: 455 meters (1,493 ft)
- Transmitter coordinates: 47.601°N 117.299°W

Links
- Public license information: Public file; LMS
- Webcast: Listen Live
- Website: 1039bobfm.com

KBBD (103.9 FM, "103.9 Bob FM") is a commercial radio station in Spokane, Washington. It is owned by the Stephens Media Group and broadcasts an adult hits radio format with the slogan is "Playing Eighties, Ninety's and Whatever". The offices and radio studios are on East 57th Avenue.

KBBD's effective radiated power (ERP) is 34,000 watts. The transmitter is on South Park Road in Spokane, amid the towers for other Spokane-area FM and TV stations.

== History ==
The station first signed on the air on October 6, 1986, as KVXO. During the period from approximately 1986–1988, KVXO was known as "Power 104", a Mainstream CHR of the same ilk as "Zoo FM", KZZU, its main format competitor. Notable personalities on "Power 104" included Lee St. Michaels and Rob Fisher (Leroy & the Pepper); Tracie Lee; Jeff Melton; Jim "The Bod" Larsin; Greg "The Blade" Young; TJ Collins & "Midnight" Mike.

In 1986, Collins began a show called "The Power Switch" where he "switched" the format and played hip hop and R&B not played on other radio stations in Spokane at the time; thus, becoming the first DJ to play hip-hop on commercial radio in Spokane. Collins also featured local and regional unsigned rap artists and began airing mixes by local DJ, GrandMixer GMS. The Power Switch was a very popular show that originally aired for two hours every Sunday night. Conflict over the show developed due to the dislike of rap music by another employee so in the fall of 1987, the show was moved to 11:30 p.m. to midnight, Monday through Friday. "Power 104" went dark on December 24, 1988, as then Program Director Ed Donohue pulled the plug on the transmitter.

It was previously known as KYWL ("Wild 103.9"), which played hip hop and R&B and called itself "Spokane's party station".

“103.9 The Hawk” KWHK played classic rock, and before that, active rock (when the station was known as "Z-Rock"). In the late 90s, KNJY “Z-Rock” was up against stiff competition with Rock 94 1/2. 103.9 started out in the 80s playing an adult contemporary leaning pop format as KVXO.

In 2004, it was owned by Citadel Radio. Mapleton bought it in 2007. In the Summer 2011 Arbitron ratings survey, BOB-FM rated #1 12+.
