= KHIP =

Radio station in Gonzales, California

Coordinates: 36.668°N 121.520°W

- Gonzales, California; United States
- Broadcast area: Santa Cruz–Monterey–Salinas, California
- Frequency: 104.3 MHz
- Branding: 104.3 The Hippo

Programming
- Format: Classic rock

Ownership
- Owner: Stephens Media Group; (SMG-Monterey, LLC)
- Sister stations: KCDU, KKHK, KPIG-FM, KWAV

History
- First air date: 1990 (as KPUP-FM)
- Former call signs: KPUP-FM (1990–1991); KHKN-FM (1991–1992); KKLF (1992–1995); KMBY-FM (1995–September 5, 2002); KTEE (September 5–12, 2002)
- Call sign meaning: K HIPpo

Technical information
- Licensing authority: FCC
- Facility ID: 9858
- Class: A
- ERP: 2,600 watts
- HAAT: 155 meters
- Repeater: 104.3 KHIP-FM1 (Carmel Valley)

Links
- Public license information: Public file; LMS
- Webcast: Listen Live
- Website: thehippo.com

KHIP is a commercial radio station in Gonzales, California, broadcasting to the Santa Cruz–Monterey–Salinas area on 104.3 FM. Its studios are in Monterey while its transmitter is located east of Salinas.

KHIP airs a classic rock music format branded as "The Hippo". It carries Las Vegas Raiders NFL games.

== History ==
KKLF was a Spanish language station in 1995 when it simulcast KIEZ.

104.3 was home of alternative rock KMBY which moved to 103.9 in a major switch in 2002.

On July 1, 2019, Mapleton Communications announced its intent to sell its remaining 37 stations to Stephens Media Group. Stephens began operating the station that same day. The sale was consummated on September 30, 2019.
