= KEYF-FM =

Radio station in Cheney, Washington

Coordinates: 47.593°N 117.297°W

- Cheney, Washington; United States
- Broadcast area: Spokane-Coeur d'Alene
- Frequency: 101.1 MHz
- Branding: Key 101

Programming
- Format: Classic hits
- Affiliations: Compass Media Networks; Premiere Networks; United Stations Radio Networks

Ownership
- Owner: Stephens Media Group; (SMG-Spokane, LLC)
- Sister stations: KBBD, KDRK-FM, KGA, KJRB, KZBD

History
- First air date: May 4, 1986
- Former call signs: KEYJ (1985–1986, CP); KEYF (1986, CP)
- Call sign meaning: Key

Technical information
- Licensing authority: FCC
- Facility ID: 53147
- Class: C
- ERP: 100,000 watts
- HAAT: 490 meters (1,610 ft)

Links
- Public license information: Public file; LMS
- Webcast: Listen live
- Website: key101fm.com

KEYF-FM (101.1 FM, "Key FM 101.1") is a commercial radio station licensed to Cheney, Washington, United States, and serving the Spokane metropolitan area. It broadcasts a classic hits format known as "Key 101" and is owned by Stephens Media Group. The studios are on East 57th Avenue in Spokane.

The transmitter is off East Jamieson Road in Freeman, Washington.

== History ==
KEYF-FM signed on the air on May 4, 1986. It had a soft AC format before flipping to oldies in 1991 after stunting with different versions of "Louie Louie" as "Louie 101.1". It changed to its current classic hits format on March 31, 2008.
