= KCDU =

Radio station in Carmel, California

Coordinates: 36.552°N 121.789°W

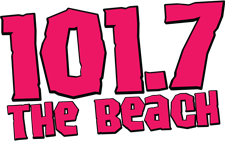
- Carmel, California; United States
- Broadcast area: Santa Cruz; Monterey; Salinas, California
- Frequency: 101.7 MHz
- Branding: 101.7 The Beach

Programming
- Format: Top 40 (CHR)

Ownership
- Owner: Stephens Media Group; (SMG-Monterey, LLC)
- Sister stations: KHIP KKHK KPIG-FM KWAV

History
- First air date: 1983
- Former call signs: KWST (1983–1987); KXDC-FM (1987–1995); KXDC (1995–1999); KBTU (1999–2003)

Technical information
- Licensing authority: FCC
- Facility ID: 54621
- Class: A
- ERP: 2,350 watts
- HAAT: 161 meters (528 ft)

Links
- Public license information: Public file; LMS
- Webcast: Listen Live
- Website: 1017thebeach.com

KCDU is a commercial radio station in Carmel, California, broadcasting to the Santa Cruz-Monterey-Salinas, California, area on 101.7 FM. Its studios are in Monterey while its transmitter is located east of the city.

KCDU airs a Top 40 (CHR) music format branded as "The Beach".

It has been owned by Stephens Media Group since October 2019.

== History ==
=== Early years (1971–2003) ===
The station came on the air in 1971 as an underground progressive station KLRB, Carmel By-The-Sea. It was sold to Walton Broadcasting out of Texas in 1982 who moved the station to Pacific Avenue in Monterey where his other station, CHR KIDD, 630-AM was. Walton changed the call letters to KWST in 1983 and six months later he changed the format to Country. The callsign would become KXDC-FM in 1987, with the KWST calls moving to a station in the Imperial Valley shortly after the call change. For much of its existence prior to 1999, it was a smooth jazz station. In 1995, the callsign dropped the FM suffix. In 1999 101.7 switched to Rhythmic oldies, and changed callsigns again to KBTU. It later moved into a rhythmic contemporary format to go against KDON, 101.7 later relaunched as 101.7 The Bomb to even fully go against KDON with a new morning drive program.

=== 101.7 The Beach (2003–present) ===
On February 28, 2003, the callsign was changed to KCDU, which flipped to Hot AC, and re-branded itself as "101.7 The Beach" with the slogan being "The Best Mix of the 80's, 90's and Today."

==== Adult hits era ====
In 2005, the station began an "All Kinds of Music" promotion to counter the influence of Jack-FM stations. The playlist expanded to include everything from "U Got It Bad" by Usher to "Pour Some Sugar on Me" by Def Leppard. The station also began running the syndicated James McPhee Dream Doctor and John Tesh shows.

==== Transition to CHR ====
In the Fall of 2011, KCDU began transitioning to CHR, first by adopting its current slogan, then cutting out all of the 70s, 80s, and 90s music it had broadcast for years. The Beach also moved its syndicated John Tesh Morning show to the new sister station B103.9FM (formerly Classical KBach). The lineup changed as well with the 2010 mid-day addition of the syndicated show "On-Air with Ryan Seacrest." Longtime jock Sybil DeAngelo relocated to a Washington state sister station, leaving Kiwi (2003–present, from the former rock station KMBY/X103.9fm) in afternoons. Promotions Manager Alyson joined the on-air line-up with the evening shift in early 2011, and Casey, who had held a 2-4 shift until Fall 2011, became the new morning show host with the transfer of John Tesh's Radio Program.

On October 19, 2012, KCDU officially completed the transition after removing all music from the 2000s.

==== Acquisition by Stephens Media Group ====
On July 1, 2019, Mapleton Communications announced its intent to sell its remaining 37 stations to Stephens Media Group, marking its entry into California. Stephens began operating the station that same day. The sale was consummated on September 30, 2019. The station has continued its CHR format after the closure of the acquisition.
