= KKHK =

Radio station in Carmel, California

Coordinates: 36.552°N 121.789°W

- Carmel, California; United States
- Broadcast area: Santa Cruz–Monterey–Salinas, California
- Frequency: 95.5 MHz
- Branding: 95.5 Bob FM

Programming
- Format: Alternative rock

Ownership
- Owner: Stephens Media Group; (SMG-Monterey, LLC)
- Sister stations: KCDU, KHIP, KPIG-FM, KWAV

History
- First air date: 1993
- Former call signs: KVOQ (1993–1994); KBOQ-FM (1994); KBOQ (1994–2008)
- Call sign meaning: "Hank" (previous branding)

Technical information
- Licensing authority: FCC
- Facility ID: 29337
- Class: A
- ERP: 1,700 watts
- HAAT: 192 meters

Links
- Public license information: Public file; LMS
- Webcast: Listen Live
- Website: 955bobfm.com

KKHK (95.5 FM, "Bob FM") is a commercial radio station in Carmel, California, broadcasting to the Santa Cruz–Monterey–Salinas area. Owned by Stephens Media Group, through licensee SMG-Monterey, LLC, it broadcasts an alternative rock format. Its studios are in Monterey while its transmitter is located east of the city.

== History ==
95.5 FM had been a classical music station branded as "K-Bach" until February 9, 2008, when the format was moved to 103.9 FM. On February 14, 2008, the call sign on 103.9 FM temporarily changed to KKHK which was then swapped with KBOQ on February 26.

On December 3, 2010, KKHK’s format changed from country as Hank FM, to adult hits branded as "Bob FM".

On July 1, 2019, Mapleton Communications announced its intent to sell its remaining 37 stations to Stephens Media Group. Stephens began operating the station that same day. The sale was consummated on September 30, 2019. Upon the closure of the acquisition, the new owners flipped the station to classic hits, still under the Bob FM branding.

Currently, the station airs an Alternative format. The station has retained the "Bob FM" name, but now uses the slogan "The 90s to Now."

== See also ==
- For information about prior use of KKHK, see KQMT, KYYS and KDFG
