= KZBD =

Radio station in Spokane, Washington

- Spokane, Washington; United States
- Broadcast area: Spokane metropolitan area; (Inland Northwest)
- Frequency: 105.7 MHz
- Branding: 105.7 Now FM

Programming
- Format: Top 40 (CHR)
- Affiliations: Premiere Networks

Ownership
- Owner: Stephens Media Group; (SMG-Spokane, LLC)
- Sister stations: KBBD, KDRK-FM, KEYF-FM, KGA, KJRB

History
- First air date: November 8, 1965
- Former call signs: KTWD (1966–1970); KEZE (1970–1995); KAEP (1995–2003)

Technical information
- Licensing authority: FCC
- Facility ID: 11243
- Class: C
- ERP: 100,000 watts
- HAAT: 582 meters (1,909 ft)
- Transmitter coordinates: 47.579°N 117.297°W
- Translators: 100.9 K265AV (Bonners Ferry, Idaho)

Links
- Public license information: Public file; LMS
- Webcast: Listen Live
- Website: 1057nowfm.com

KZBD (105.7 FM, "105.7 Now FM") is a commercial radio station in Spokane, Washington. It is owned by Stephens Media Group, through licensee SMG-Spokane, LLC, and airs a Top 40 (CHR) radio format. KZBD carries "Elvis Duran and the Morning Show" in AM drive time, syndicated by Premiere Networks.

KZBD has an effective radiated power of 100,000 watts, the maximum output for non-grandfathered FM stations. It is heard in parts of Washington, Idaho and Montana. The transmitter is in Spokane, off South Krell Ridge Lane, on Krell Hill, also known as "Tower Mountain." The studios and offices are on East 57th Avenue.

== History ==
=== KTWD ===
In July 1965, the father-son team of Loren (father) and Terry W. (son) Denbrook, doing business as Denbrook Enterprises, was granted a Federal Communications Commission construction permit to build an FM station in Spokane on 105.7 MHz using the call sign KTWD. KTWD signed on the air on November 8, 1965.

The station's transmitter and studio were located on 610 West Garland Avenue in Spokane, and the station played popular music. KTWD was Spokane's first FM-only commercial station, not co-owned with an AM station. It was also Spokane's first FM stereo station. Terry Denbrook served as the station's chief engineer and station manager. The call letters were Terry W. Denbrook's initials.

=== KEZE-FM ===
In 1970, Denbrook Enterprises sold the station to Bellevue Broadcasters, which changed the format to easy listening and the call letters to KEZE-FM. The station used the identification "KEZE, E-Z listening." It was paired with KEZE (1380 AM), which adopted a simulcast of the FM station's beautiful music format.

In 1979, Great American Broadcasting acquired KEZE (AM), switching it to a middle of the road format as KCKO. KEZE-FM was acquired by Kaye-Smith Enterprises. Kaye-Smith already owned Top 40-formatted KJRB, so the FM station flipped to a format that would also bring in young listeners, album-oriented rock, and called itself "Rock 106 - Spokane's Best Rock." In 1989, KJRB and KEZE were acquired by Apollo Broadcasting. Under Apollo, KEZE leaned more toward active rock, with plenty of harder-edged rock acts on its playlist.

=== The Peak and The Buzzard ===
On October 20, 1995, the station flipped to Adult Album Alternative (AAA) as KAEP, "105.7 The Peak." The former album rock format and KEZE call letters returned to the FM dial at 96.9 on March 4, 1996.

In 2003, 105.7 shifted to active rock, becoming "105.7 The Buzzard", KZBD. In 2008, the station switched back to "105.7 The Peak", but with an alternative rock format instead of AAA. It was also the Spokane home of two syndicated shows, "The Bob & Tom Show" in AM drive time and "Loveline" at night.

=== Now 105.7 FM ===
On May 19, 2010, KZBD flipped to a Top 40/CHR format, branded as "Now 105.7 FM." This marked the first time that Spokane had a full-powered Top 40/CHR format since 2005, when KZZU flipped to Adult Top 40. The station added Elvis Duran's syndicated morning show to its lineup on May 24, 2010. Middays featured On Air with Ryan Seacrest, which was added the day of the switch. DJ Kowax hosted afternoons and B-Mega was heard in nights, both local and live.

When KIXZ flipped to Top 40/CHR in March 2012, it picked up both Duran's and Seacrest's shows. Both programs were owned by Clear Channel Communications, which also owned KIXZ. (Clear Channel has since become iHeartMedia, Inc.) On May 8, 2014, KZBD once again became Spokane's only Top 40/CHR when KIXZ returned to country music (they have since switched to alternative as KFOO-FM).

On September 30, 2019, the station was sold to Stephens Media Group after it acquired most of the properties of former owner Mapleton Communications.
