= KDRK-FM =

Radio station in Spokane, Washington

Spokane, Washington; United States
- Broadcast area: Spokane–Coeur d'Alene
- Frequency: 93.7 MHz
- Branding: 93.7 The Mountain

Programming
- Format: Country

Ownership
- Owner: Stephens Media Group; (SMG-Spokane, LLC)
- Sister stations: KBBD, KEYF-FM, KGA, KJRB, KZBD

History
- First air date: December 16, 1965
- Former call signs: KDNC-FM (1965–1974); KXXR-FM (1974–1979)

Technical information
- Licensing authority: FCC
- Facility ID: 11242
- Class: C
- ERP: 64,000 watts
- HAAT: 739 meters
- Transmitter coordinates: 47.570°N 117.083°W
- Translator: K296BJ 107.1 Bonners Ferry, Idaho

Links
- Public license information: Public file; LMS
- Webcast: Listen Live
- Website: 937themountain.com

KDRK-FM (93.7 FM, "The Mountain") is a country music radio station serving the Spokane, Washington area. The station broadcasts at 93.7 MHz with an effective radiated power of 64,000 watts. It is owned by Stephens Media Group, through licensee SMG-Spokane, LLC.

KDRK is a Contemporary Country station known as "93.7 The Mountain" and plays today's hit country songs and mixes in familiar country music from the past. It is also carried on translator K296BJ, 107.1 in Bonners Ferry, Idaho to serve Boundary County, as the area is very mountainous and the main signal is blocked.

KDRK-FM was formerly known as "Cat Country 94" and "93.7 The Cat". It initially was started in December 1965 as KDNC-FM, the sister station to KDNC 1440 AM.

It is one of seven local Spokane FM radio stations heard across Canada to subscribers of the Shaw Direct satellite TV service.

On October 11, 2011 at 6 AM, after playing "Go Rest High on That Mountain" by Vince Gill, the station dropped "The Cat" and began stunting with the bell from "Hell's Bells" by AC/DC, a ticking clock, an announcer saying "KDRK Spokane, Mission Control T-minus _ minutes", and clips of songs from Schoolhouse Rock and Animaniacs. At 11 AM, the station relaunched their country format as "93.7 The Mountain". The first song as The Mountain was "How Do You Like Me Now?!" by Toby Keith.

On September 30, 2019, Stephens Media Group completed its acquisition of the Mapleton Communications properties.

== National radio shows ==
- American Country Countdown with Kix Brooks

== Previous logo ==
(used from ?-2008)
