= KGA =

Radio station in Spokane, Washington

- Spokane, Washington; United States
- Broadcast area: Eastern Washington - Northwestern Idaho
- Frequency: 1510 kHz
- Branding: Fox Sports Radio 103.5/1510, The Game

Programming
- Format: Sports
- Affiliations: Fox Sports Radio; Spokane Chiefs; Spokane Indians

Ownership
- Owner: Stephens Media Group; (SMG-Spokane, LLC)
- Sister stations: KBBD, KDRK-FM, KEYF-FM, KJRB, KZBD

History
- First air date: January 31, 1927

Technical information
- Licensing authority: FCC
- Facility ID: 11234
- Class: B
- Power: 50,000 watts day 45,000 watts critical hours 540 watts night
- Transmitter coordinates: 47°30′7.6″N 117°23′10.7″W
- Translator: 103.5 K278CY (Spokane)

Links
- Public license information: Public file; LMS
- Webcast: Listen Live
- Website: 1035thegame.com

KGA (1510 AM) is a commercial radio station in Spokane, Washington. Owned by Stephens Media Group, it broadcasts a sports radio format. KGA's studios and offices are on East 57th Avenue. Most of the programming comes from Fox Sports Radio. The station carries broadcasts of the Spokane Indians minor league baseball team and the Spokane Chiefs junior ice hockey team. Going on the air in 1927, it was one of the earliest radio stations in Washington.

By day, KGA is powered at 50,000 watts non-directional, the maximum for commercial AM stations. But to reduce interference to other stations on 1510 AM, during critical hours, the power is lowered to 45,000 watts. And at night, power is greatly reduced to 540 watts. The transmitter site is on East Stutler Road near U.S. Route 195 in Spangle, Washington. Programming is also heard on 99-watt FM translator K278CY at 103.5 MHz in Spokane.

== History ==
=== Early years ===
KGA signed on the air on January 31, 1927. Its original owner was Louis Wasmer. KGA's first studios were in the old Radio Center Building across the street from the Davenport Hotel. Its transmitter was on the northside of Spokane where the Lidgerwood Elementary School is now located.

In the 1930s, KGA was powered at 5,000 watts, broadcasting at 1470 kilocycles. It moved to 1510 after the North American Regional Broadcasting Agreement (NARBA) took effect in 1941. KGA was an affiliate of the NBC Blue Network, airing its dramas, comedies, variety shows, news and sports during the "Golden Age of Radio." That network later became ABC Radio. As network programming moved from radio to television in the 1950s and 60s, KGA switched to a full service, middle of the road (MOR) format, airing popular adult music, news and sports.

KGA played Top 40 hits from January 1968 until June 1969, featuring disc jockeys Shane Showtime (Gibson) and Joe Fialla. It was more successful as a country music outlet from 1969 until 1994. But by the 1990s, most people listening to country music were switching to the FM band.

=== Talk and Sports ===
KGA flipped to a news/talk format in 1994. It relied mostly on nationally syndicated talk shows from commentators such as Bill O'Reilly, Laura Ingraham and Michael Savage, along with several local programs. Former Los Angeles police detective and author Mark Fuhrman, who lives in nearby Coeur d'Alene, Idaho, hosted a local morning show on weekdays until his program was discontinued in November 2007. In April 2008, KGA's news/talk format moved to sister station 790 KJRB, with KJRB's sports format switched to KGA.

KGA has had several owners (including Gonzaga University in its early history), has changed frequency several times, and has had its studio and transmitter site relocated over the years. But it has retained the same three-letter call sign from its founding. No other station in Spokane has kept its call letters over so many decades.

=== Loss of Clear-Channel status ===
KGA was a 50,000-watt clear-channel Class A station for most of its life, and could be heard after sunset around the Pacific Northwest, plus part of Western Canada. On July 15, 2008, KGA reduced its nighttime power from 50,000 watts to 15,000 watts, surrendered its status as a Class A, downgrading to Class B, and changed its directional antenna system.. Class A stations have the widest coverage areas and best protection from interference from other stations.

All of this was done so that its then-sister station, KPIG (AM) in Piedmont, California, could increase its nighttime power from 230 watts to 2,400 watts and gain nearly a million potential listeners in the San Francisco Bay Area. KGA received a construction permit to simplify its antenna system to a single tower with non-directional operation (FCC.gov AM Station Query). It was granted a nighttime power reduction, to 540 watts, with a slight power reduction just after sunrise and just before sunset critical hours to 45,000 watts.

=== Sports and Hip Hop ===
In January 2019, after adding a new translator in Spokane on 103.5 FM, the station dropped Fox Sports Radio and flipped to urban contemporary as 103.5 The Game. While playing hip hop music and other rhythmic contemporary hits, the station retained its existing contracts to broadcast sports play-by-play. It began using the slogan "Sports and Hip Hop."

On September 30, 2019, the station was sold to Stephens Media Group after it acquired most of the properties of former owner Mapleton Communications. On March 19, 2021, the station dropped its urban format and returned to being a full-time network affiliate of Fox Sports Radio.

== Former logos ==
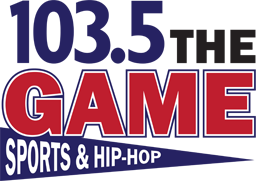
103.5 The Game logo (January 2019-March 2021)

== See also ==
- List of three-letter broadcast call signs in the United States
