= KQPZ =

- Lewistown, Montana; United States
- Frequency: 95.9 MHz
- Branding: ROCK 95 Lewistown

Programming
- Format: Mainstream rock

Ownership
- Owner: Montana Broadcast Communications, Inc.

History
- First air date: April 1, 1975
- Former call signs: KLCM (1978–2018)

Technical information
- Licensing authority: FCC
- Facility ID: 43559
- Class: A
- ERP: 3,000 watts
- HAAT: -70 meters (-229 feet)
- Transmitter coordinates: 47°04′13″N 109°24′26″W

Links
- Public license information: Public file; LMS
- Webcast: Listen Live
- Website: kqpzradio.com

KQPZ (95.9 FM) is a radio station licensed to serve Lewistown, Montana. The station is owned by Montana Broadcast Communications, Inc. It airs a Mainstream rock format.

The station was assigned the KLCM call letters by the Federal Communications Commission on May 2, 1978. The station changed its call sign to KQPZ and its format to rock on April 1, 2018 after 43 years with its classic hits format.
