= KJRB =

Radio station in Spokane, Washington

- Spokane, Washington; United States
- Broadcast area: Spokane metropolitan area
- Frequency: 790 kHz
- Branding: 94.1 The Bear

Programming
- Format: Mainstream rock

Ownership
- Owner: Stephens Media Group; (SMG-Spokane, LLC)
- Sister stations: KBBD, KDRK-FM, KEYF-FM, KGA, KZBD

History
- First air date: September 1, 1947
- Former call signs: KNEW (1947–1966)

Technical information
- Licensing authority: FCC
- Facility ID: 11235
- Class: D
- Power: 4,400 watts day 34 watts night
- Transmitter coordinates: 47°30′7″N 117°23′8″W
- Translator: 94.1 K231CU (Spokane)

Links
- Public license information: Public file; LMS
- Webcast: Listen Live
- Website: 941thebear.com

KJRB (790 kHz) is a commercial radio station in Spokane, Washington. KJRB is owned by Stephens Media Group, through licensee SMG-Spokane, LLC, and airs a mainstream rock radio format. It calls itself "94.1 The Bear".

KJRB has a daytime power of 4,400 watts; at night, to protect other stations on AM 790, it reduces power to 34 watts. It uses a non-directional antenna at all times. The transmitter is on East Stutler Road off U.S. Route 195 in Spangle, Washington. KJRB also simulcasts on FM translator 94.1 K231CU, powered at 99 watts.

== History ==
KJRB has had a long and colorful history showcasing many famous disc jockeys, including Randy Evans and Treasure Goodtimes (now known as Ichabod Caine and Scallops), Larry "SuperJock" Lujack, Charlie Brown (who went to KUBE 93 FM and later KJR-FM 95.7 in Seattle), Ric Hansen, Jim Kampmann, Danny Holiday (Daniel Thygesen), Joe Michaels, Jack "Commander Dunk" Gordon, Ross Woodward, Norm Gregory, Brian Gregory, Ricky Shannon, Suds Coleman, Rick Rydell, Marie McCallister, Steven West, Ralphie Koal, with Frank Hanel and "Sunshine" Shelly Monahan.

KJRB's call letters originally reflected the fact that it had been owned by Kaye-Smith Enterprises, the owners of then-Top 40 station KJR in Seattle. KJRB moved towards an Oldies format in the 1980s, a news/talk station in the early 1990s, and sports as 790 The Fan, from 1999 until April 2008, when the sports format was moved to sister station 1510 KGA. In return, KGA's news/talk format moved to KJRB.

The station signed on the air on September 1, 1947, and began as a Mutual and Don Lee affiliate.

During the station's early years as a sports station, KJRB also broadcast "hot talk" shows such as Don and Mike, Tom Leykis, and Phil Hendrie, with evening and weekend programming provided by Fox Sports Radio, Sporting News Radio and Westwood One.

On October 24, 2012, KJRB shifted its format to All-News. On September 19, 2013, KJRB changed format to Classic country, branded as "The Eagle". On June 1, 2015, KJRB switched back to the sports format as "Fox Sports 790." That gave Mapleton Communications two all-sports stations in Spokane, KJRB and KGA. On March 28, 2016, KJRB changed the format to adult standards, branded as "Magic 790". On March 21, 2017, KJRB changed the format to classic rock, branded as "94.1 The Bear" (simulcasting on FM translator K231CU 94.1 FM Spokane).

94.1 The Bear logo until August 2018.

On September 30, 2019, the station was sold to Stephens Media Group after Stephens acquired most of the properties of former owner Mapleton Communications.

== Translator ==
KJRB also broadcasts on the following FM translator:

Broadcast translator for KJRB
Call sign	Frequency	City of license	FID	ERP (W)	Class	FCC info
K231CU	94.1 FM	Spokane, Washington	143870	99	D	LMS
