= Oklahoma State System of Higher Education =

- Type: Public University System
- Established: March 11, 1941
- Chancellor: Sean Burrage
- Location: Oklahoma City, Oklahoma, United States
- Website: www.okhighered.org

The Oklahoma State System of Higher Education is the state's legal structure for providing public education at the collegiate level. It is a coordinated system of colleges and universities located throughout the state.

== State System overview ==
With a current enrollment of more than 247,000 students, the State System consists of 25 colleges and universities (made up of two research universities, 11 regional universities, and 12 community colleges), 11 constituent agencies, and a higher education center. The State System is coordinated by the Oklahoma State Regents for Higher Education, and each institution is governed by a board of regents. There are currently three constitutional boards of regents that govern a majority of colleges and universities in the state: the OSU/A&M Board of Regents, the University of Oklahoma Board of Regents, and the Regional University System of Oklahoma (RUSO). In addition, there are 12 statutory boards of regents that govern specific community colleges in the state.

== Research universities ==
Research universities governed by the OSU/A&M Board of Regents

- Oklahoma State University

Research universities governed by the University of Oklahoma Board of Regents

- University of Oklahoma

== Regional universities ==
Regional universities governed by the Board of Regents for the Oklahoma Agricultural and Mechanical Colleges

- Langston University
- Oklahoma Panhandle State University

Regional universities governed by the University of Oklahoma Board of Regents

- Cameron University
- Rogers State University

Regional universities governed by the Regional University System of Oklahoma

- East Central University
- Northeastern State University
- Northwestern Oklahoma State University
- Southeastern Oklahoma State University
- Southwestern Oklahoma State University
- University of Central Oklahoma

Regional university governed by the Board of Regents of the University of Science & Arts of Oklahoma

- University of Science and Arts of Oklahoma

== Community colleges ==
Community colleges governed by OSU/A&M Board of Regents

- Connors State College
- Northeastern Oklahoma A&M College

Community colleges governed by a college-specific statutory governing board

- Carl Albert State College
- Eastern Oklahoma State College
- Murray State College
- Northern Oklahoma College
- Oklahoma City Community College
- Redlands Community College
- Rose State College
- Seminole State College
- Tulsa Community College
- Western Oklahoma State College

== Constituent agencies ==
Constituent agencies of Oklahoma State University

- OSU-Oklahoma City
- OSU-Tulsa
- OSU Agricultural Experiment Station
- OSU Center for Health Sciences
- OSU College of Veterinary Medicine
- OSU Cooperative Extension Service
- OSU Institute of Technology, Okmulgee

Constituent agencies of the University of Oklahoma

- OU - Tulsa
- OU Geological Survey
- OU Health Sciences Center
- OU Law Center

== Higher education programs/sites ==
- Greater Oklahoma City Downtown Consortium
- Langston University, Oklahoma City
- Northern Oklahoma College, Stillwater
- University Center at Ponca City
- University Center of Southern Oklahoma
