= Ardmore, Oklahoma =

City in Oklahoma, US

- City
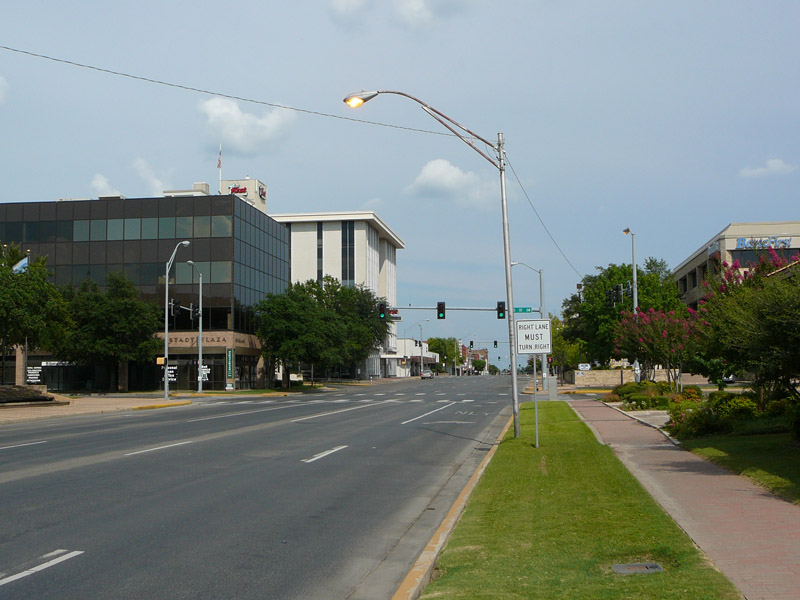

- Seal

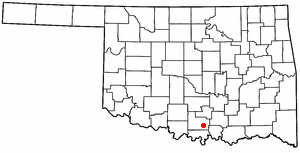
- Location in the state of Oklahoma
- Coordinates: 34°17′22″N 97°09′59″W
- Country: United States
- State: Oklahoma
- County: Carter

Government
  - Mayor: John Credle, Jr

Area
  - Total: 51.76 sq mi (134.06 km^{2})
  - Land: 49.83 sq mi (129.06 km^{2})
  - Water: 1.93 sq mi (5.00 km^{2})
- Elevation: 879 ft (268 m)

Population (2020)
  - Total: 24,725
  - Density: 496.2/sq mi (191.58/km^{2})
- Time zone: UTC−6 (CST)
  - Summer (DST): UTC−6 (CDT)
- ZIP codes: 73401-73403
- Area code: 580
- FIPS code: 40-02600
- GNIS feature ID: 2409727
- Website: www.ardmorecity.org

Ardmore is a city in and the county seat of Carter County, Oklahoma, United States. The population was 24,725 at the time of the 2020 census, a 1.8% increase over the 2010 census figure of 24,283. The Ardmore micropolitan area had an estimated population of 48,491 in 2013. Ardmore is 90 miles (140 km) from both Oklahoma City and Dallas/Fort Worth, Texas, at the junction of Interstate 35 and U.S. Highway 70, and is generally considered the hub of the 13-county region of South Central Oklahoma, also known by state tourism pamphlets as "Chickasaw Country" and previously "Lake and Trail Country". It is also a part of the Texoma region. Ardmore is situated about 9 miles (14 km) south of the Arbuckle Mountains and is located at the eastern margin of the Healdton Basin, one of the most oil-rich regions of the United States.

== History ==
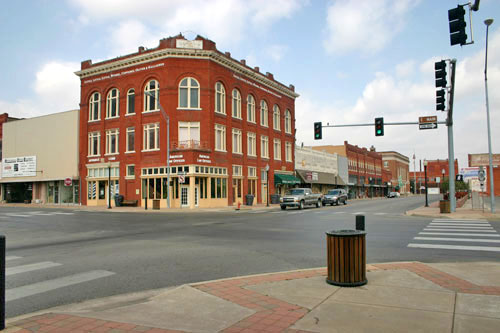
Main and Washington streets, downtown Ardmore

Ardmore, Indian Territory, began with a plowed ditch for a Main Street in the summer of 1887 in Pickens County, Chickasaw Nation. It owes much of its existence to the construction of the Santa Fe Railroad through the area during that time. It grew, as most frontier towns grew, over the years into a trading outpost for the region. A large fire in 1895 destroyed much of the fledgling town, which forced residents to rebuild nearly the entire town. In the early 1900s, Ardmore became well known for its abundance of cotton-growing fields and eventually became known as the world's largest inland cotton port.

The city found itself positioned next to one of the largest oil fields ever produced in Oklahoma, the Healdton Oil Field. After its discovery in 1913, entrepreneurs and wildcatters flooded the area, and Carter County quickly became the largest oil-producing county in Oklahoma, and has remained so ever since. Ardmore has remained an energy center for the region, with the region's natural wealth giving birth to such energy giants as the Noble Energy companies, among others. On September 27, 1915, a railroad car containing casing gas exploded, killing 43 people, injuring many, and destroying much of downtown, including areas rebuilt after the 1895 fire. The disaster, which made national news, gave residents the resolve to establish the city's first fire department to ensure that such events would not recur in the future. On April 22, 1966, Ardmore was the site of the worst plane crash in Oklahoma history, which killed 83 people. On May 7, 1995, an F3 tornado struck Ardmore, killing three people and injuring six others. On February 10, 2009, an EF4 tornado destroyed several structures in and near the Majestic Hills neighborhood, just north of Ardmore.

=== Sports ===
Ardmore was home to minor league baseball. The Ardmore Cardinals was the primary name of Ardmore teams that played as members of the Texas League (1904), Texas-Oklahoma League (1911–1914), Western Association (1917), Texas-Oklahoma League (1921–1922), Western Association (1923), Oklahoma State League (1924), Western Association (1924–1926), Sooner State League (1947–1957) and Texas League (1961). Ardmore captured league championships in 1923, 1925 and 1957. Ardmore was an affiliate of the Cleveland Indians (1947–1948), St. Louis Cardinals (1953–1957) and Baltimore Orioles (1961).

Baseball Hall of Fame inductee Carl Hubbell played for the Ardmore Bearcats in 1924, his first professional season.

== Geography ==
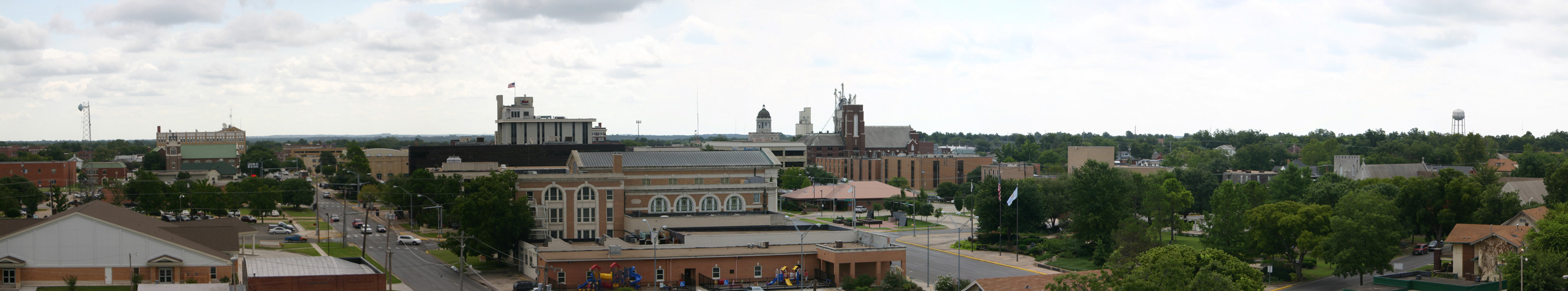
Panorama looking east, downtown Ardmore

Ardmore is located in southeastern Carter County. It is bordered to the west by the city of Lone Grove and to the east by the town of Dickson. Via Interstate 35, which passes through the west side of Ardmore, Oklahoma City is 97 miles (156 km) to the north, while Fort Worth, Texas, is 103 miles (166 km) to the south.

According to the United States Census Bureau, Ardmore has a total area of 51.8 square miles (134.1 km^{2}), of which 49.9 square miles (129.2 km^{2}) is land and 1.9 square miles (4.9 km^{2}), or 3.67%, is water.

Ardmore is located approximately 10 miles (16 km) south of the Arbuckles, an ancient, eroded range spanning some 62 mi (100 km) across southern Oklahoma. The geology is highly variegated within the area, with uplifted and folded ridges visible within the shoreline of some of the lakes surrounding Ardmore. The city of Ardmore has no intracity streams or rivers, but is part of the Washita and Red River watersheds, with two tributaries, Caddo and Hickory creeks, flanking the broad, low area in which Ardmore is situated. Ardmore is also 3.1 mi (5 km) north of Lake Murray, an impoundment of the two arms of Anadarche Creek, which eventually flows into the western reaches of Lake Texoma.

=== Climate ===
Climate data for Ardmore, Oklahoma. Normals (1991-2020)
Month	Jan	Feb	Mar	Apr	May	Jun	Jul	Aug	Sep	Oct	Nov	Dec	Year
Record high °F (°C)	83 (28)	87 (31)	92 (33)	96 (36)	97 (36)	105 (41)	109 (43)	110 (43)	107 (42)	98 (37)	87 (31)	92 (33)	110 (43)
Mean daily maximum °F (°C)	53.7 (12.1)	58.1 (14.5)	66.8 (19.3)	75.0 (23.9)	82.1 (27.8)	89.8 (32.1)	95.3 (35.2)	95.0 (35.0)	87.0 (30.6)	77.2 (25.1)	65.2 (18.4)	55.4 (13.0)	75.1 (23.9)
Daily mean °F (°C)	42.6 (5.9)	47.6 (8.7)	55.8 (13.2)	64.2 (17.9)	72.1 (22.3)	80.3 (26.8)	84.9 (29.4)	84.5 (29.2)	76.9 (24.9)	65.8 (18.8)	54.3 (12.4)	45.0 (7.2)	64.5 (18.1)
Mean daily minimum °F (°C)	31.5 (−0.3)	36.5 (2.5)	44.9 (7.2)	53.5 (11.9)	62.2 (16.8)	70.8 (21.6)	74.5 (23.6)	74.0 (23.3)	66.8 (19.3)	54.5 (12.5)	43.3 (6.3)	34.6 (1.4)	53.9 (12.2)
Record low °F (°C)	−4 (−20)	0 (−18)	6 (−14)	26 (−3)	37 (3)	48 (9)	58 (14)	54 (12)	43 (6)	25 (−4)	13 (−11)	5 (−15)	−4 (−20)
Average precipitation inches (mm)	1.84 (47)	2.21 (56)	2.81 (71)	3.28 (83)	5.72 (145)	4.58 (116)	2.49 (63)	2.67 (68)	3.60 (91)	3.86 (98)	2.37 (60)	2.60 (66)	38.03 (964)
Average snowfall inches (cm)	0.8 (2.0)	0.7 (1.8)	0.1 (0.25)	0 (0)	0 (0)	0 (0)	0 (0)	0 (0)	0 (0)	0 (0)	0.1 (0.25)	1.0 (2.5)	2.7 (6.8)
Source 1: Weatherbase.com
Source 2: NOAA

== Demographics ==
Historical population
Census	Pop.	Note	%±
1900	5,681		—
1910	8,618		51.7%
1920	14,181		64.6%
1930	15,741		11.0%
1940	16,886		7.3%
1950	17,890		5.9%
1960	20,184		12.8%
1970	20,881		3.5%
1980	23,689		13.4%
1990	23,079		−2.6%
2000	23,711		2.7%
2010	24,283		2.4%
2020	24,725		1.8%

=== 2020 census ===
As of the 2020 census, Ardmore had a population of 24,725. The median age was 39.5 years. 23.2% of residents were under the age of 18 and 20.2% of residents were 65 years of age or older. For every 100 females there were 93.4 males, and for every 100 females age 18 and over there were 90.6 males age 18 and over.

86.6% of residents lived in urban areas, while 13.4% lived in rural areas.

There were 9,941 households in Ardmore, of which 29.9% had children under the age of 18 living in them. Of all households, 39.8% were married-couple households, 21.0% were households with a male householder and no spouse or partner present, and 32.3% were households with a female householder and no spouse or partner present. About 32.0% of all households were made up of individuals and 14.4% had someone living alone who was 65 years of age or older.

There were 11,400 housing units, of which 12.8% were vacant. Among occupied housing units, 57.2% were owner-occupied and 42.8% were renter-occupied. The homeowner vacancy rate was 2.3% and the rental vacancy rate was 13.2%.

Racial composition as of the 2020 census
Race	Percent
White	60.1%
Black or African American	9.2%
American Indian and Alaska Native	9.0%
Asian	2.0%
Native Hawaiian and Other Pacific Islander	0.2%
Some other race	5.8%
Two or more races	13.7%
Hispanic or Latino (of any race)	10.7%

=== 2010 census ===
As of the 2010 census, there were 24,283 people living in the city. The population density was 482.7 inhabitants per square mile (186.4/km^{2}). There were 10,926 housing units at an average density of 222.4 per square mile (85.9/km^{2}). The racial makeup of the city was 73.02% White, 11.27% African American, 8.78% Native American, 0.99% Asian, 0.02% Pacific Islander, 1.55% from other races, and 4.37% from two or more races. Hispanic or Latino of any race were 3.70% of the population.

There were 9,646 households, out of which 30.0% had children under the age of 18 living with them, 47.4% were married couples living together, 31.2% had a female householder with no husband present, and 34.6% were non-families. 14.7% of all households were made up of individuals, and 14.7% had someone living alone who was 65 years of age or older. The average household size was 2.36 and the average family size was 2.95.

In the city, the population was spread out, with 25.1% under the age of 18, 8.1% from 18 to 24, 25.8% from 25 to 44, 22.2% from 45 to 64, and 18.8% who were 65 years of age or older. The median age was 39 years. For every 100 females, there were 110.6 males. For every 100 females age 18 and over, there were 108.6 males.

The median income for a household in the city was $28,046, and the median income for a family was $37,758. Males had a median income of $28,685 versus $23,070 for females. The per capita income for the city was $16,502. About 13.6% of families and 18.3% of the population were below the poverty line, including 24.9% of those under age 18 and 12.0% of those age 65 or over.

== Economy ==
Ardmore is the principal center of trade for a ten-county region in South Central Oklahoma, with a retail pull factor of 1.7–1.9. Ardmore's major employers are Michelin North America, with 1,900 employees, who announced its plan to close the tire building portion of the plant in 2025, and Mercy Hospital Ardmore, with 900 employees. Several hundred employees work for regional distribution centers for Best Buy, Dollar Tree (Marietta) and Dollar General Stores, among others. Until early 2009, Ardmore was also home to a large regional distribution center for the now-defunct retail electronics chain Circuit City and was also home to a 1-800-flowers call center. In 2010 Ardmore lost another technology company, IMTEC, which was purchased by 3M and moved away to California. The 85,000 bbl/d (13,500 m^{3}/d) Valero refinery in northeast Ardmore employs some 250 area residents. Ardmore is also home to the Samuel Roberts Noble Foundation, among the nation's 50 largest private foundations, primarily engaged in agricultural bioresearch activities. In 2001, East Jordan Iron Works opened a foundry located at the Ardmore Industrial Airpark. On September 24, 2020, Oklahoma Blood Institute opened one of the largest blood donation facilities in the state in Oklahoma.

== Arts and culture ==
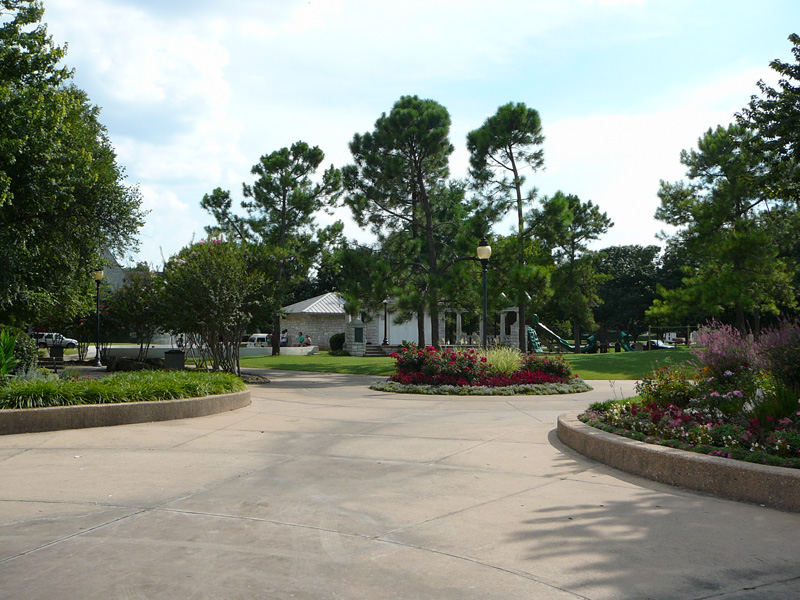
Central Park, view towards historic bandstand, downtown Ardmore

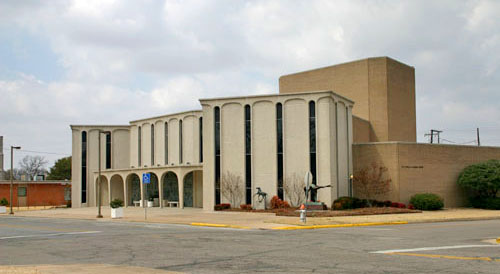
Charles B. Goddard Center for the Visual and Performing Arts, downtown Ardmore

Amenities include:

- Ardmore Civic Auditorium, a historic city building that hosts concerts and other local events
- Hardy Murphy Coliseum, historic WPA-built facility that hosts rodeos, cutting shows and various regional events

The Ardmore Masonic Lodge is one of the oldest civic organizations in Ardmore.

The movies Dillinger (1973) and Fast Charlie... the Moonbeam Rider (1979) were partially filmed in Ardmore.

== Education ==
=== Colleges and universities ===
Ardmore is home to the University Center of Southern Oklahoma (a consortium-model system of higher education) which offers courses and degrees to the local population from four participating institutions of higher education: Murray State College, Southeastern Oklahoma State University, East Central University and Oklahoma State University (from the Oklahoma City campus).

=== Primary and secondary schools ===
Ardmore City Schools, Plainview Public Schools, and the Ardmore Christian School operate public schools in Ardmore.

Ardmore-Oak Hall Episcopal School is one of only three Episcopal diocesan schools in the state of Oklahoma.

CareerTech has a campus in Ardmore.

== Media ==
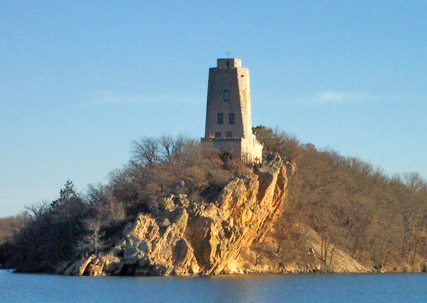
Tucker's Tower, on the eastern shore of Lake Murray, which borders the southern city limits of Ardmore

=== Newspaper ===
- The Daily Ardmoreite, local newspaper since 1893.

=== Television ===
- KTEN – Channel 10 (NBC)
- KTEN – DT Channel 10-2 (The CW Texoma)
- KTEN – DT Channel 10-3 (ABC)
- KXII – Channel 12 (CBS)
- KXII – DT Channel 12-2 (My Texoma)
- KXII – DT Channel 12-3 (FOX Texoma)
- K36KE-D – DT Channel 36 (PBS OETA)

=== Radio ===
AM

- KVSO – 1240 on the radio dial

FM

- KLCU – 90.3 (Public/NPR – Cameron University, Lawton)
- KFXI – 92.1 (Country)
- KTRX – 92.7 (Classic Rock)
- KKAJ – 95.7 (Country)
- KICM – 97.7 (Country)
- KYNZ – 107.1 (Oldies)

== Transportation ==
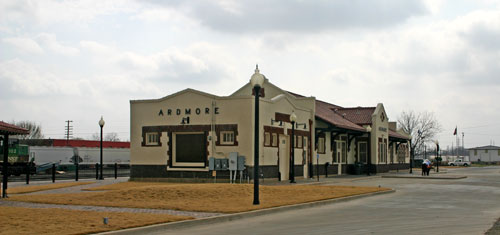
Historic Santa Fe Rail Station and adjacent track yard. This facility serves as the Amtrak station for Ardmore on the Heartland Flyer route.

=== Highways ===
Interstate 35 passes through the western side of Ardmore, as it traverses the United States from Duluth, Minnesota, to Laredo, Texas.

Ardmore has four exits off I-35:

- Exit 29 (US-70 east)
- Exits 31A-B (State Highway 199 east/U.S. 70 west, respectively)
- Exit 32 (12th St NW)
- Exit 33 (State Highway 142).

Ardmore is also home to the junction of US-70 and US-77, SH-142 and SH-199. Ardmore is connected to Lake Murray via State Highway 77S.

=== Airports ===
Ardmore has two general aviation airports, Ardmore Downtown Executive Airport and Ardmore Municipal Airport. In the early 1950s, commercial air transportation was provided to the Municipal Airport by Central Airlines. Currently, the nearest scheduled air service is available at Will Rogers World Airport in Oklahoma City and Dallas/Fort Worth International Airport, 99 miles (159 km) north and 95 miles (153 km) south of Ardmore, respectively. Ardmore is linked by rail with the DFW Airport via the Heartland Flyer to TexRail connection.

=== Rail ===
Ardmore has one principal rail line, that being one of the Burlington Northern Santa Fe mainlines running from Fort Worth, Texas to Oklahoma City (also connecting with Kansas City and Chicago), being the route of the current Heartland Flyer passenger rail service. This line was formerly part of the Atchison, Topeka and Santa Fe rail network before the merger with Burlington Northern. The line dates back to 1887, and the first train arrived on July 28 in that year. The company has multiple parallel tracks (5+) running through central Ardmore (MP 450.5), added concomitantly with the rise of the trading status of the city and region throughout the early 1900s. There is also a lightly used transverse rail spur from the BNSF line to the Michelin tire plant in west Ardmore, mainly intended for the transport of raw materials to the factory. BNSF has given Site Certification to the Ameripointe Logistics Park in Ardmore, meaning the railroad has identified the location as an optimal rail-served site meeting ten economic development criteria, intended to minimize development risks customers may face.

=== Mass transit ===
The historic Santa Fe depot in downtown Ardmore is also a stop on Amtrak's Heartland Flyer train route, with daily service to and from Oklahoma City and Fort Worth.

Ardmore also has a scheduled stop on the Greyhound/Jefferson Bus Lines system.

Southern Oklahoma Rural Transportation System (SORTS) began operations in 1985, and offers full services to the four counties of Bryan, Carter, Coal and Love. The program currently offers demand response services with contract transportation provided for work routes, medical routes and rural routes meeting the needs of the entire area.

Early on, Ardmore had streetcars. The Ardmore Traction Company was organized in the Fall of 1905. It had pretentions of building all the way to Springer, Oklahoma, about 7 miles, but had a much smaller system operational around town by January 1, 1906. In January 1908 it built an additional 3 miles to the company-owned Lorena Park. But the company was in receivership by early 1910, when the system consisted of 4.7 miles of tracks in operation, 2 new single truck cars, 2 double truck cars, a convertible car, a summer car, and the amusement park. At some point it changed names to the Ardmore Electric Railway, and reorganizing again in 1916, ending up as the Ardmore Railway Company. By August 1918, the system was down to 4 cars and 3.37 miles of track. World War I gave the system a brief boom, but by 1920 it was losing $100-$400/month. Abandonment was requested and granted in 1922. The tracks were removed in the 1930’s as a WPA project.

=== Historic buildings ===
The following are still present in Ardmore:

- Ardmore Carnegie Library
- Ardmore Historic Commercial District. Ardmore also has the Ardmore Main Street Authority, one of the various Main Street programs which act in the interests of commercial district revitalization.
- Ardmore Municipal Auditorium
- Black Theater of Ardmore
- Carter County Courthouse
- Central Park Bandstand
- Dornick Hills Country Club
- Douglas High School Auditorium
- Dunbar School
- Galt-Franklin Home
- Hardy Murphy Coliseum
- Johnson Home
- Lake Murray State Park
- Oklahoma, New Mexico and Pacific Railroad Depot
- Sayre-Mann House
- Turner House

The NRHP-listed Choctaw, Oklahoma and Gulf Railroad Viaduct, previously in Ardmore, has been demolished. The Brady Cabin is given as 38 miles northwest of Ardmore.

== Notable people ==
- Thomas Benson, linebacker for the Los Angeles Raiders and three other NFL teams
- Justin Blackmon, former wide receiver for Plainview High School, the Oklahoma State Cowboys, and the Jacksonville Jaguars
- Terry Cline Ph.D., former Oklahoma Health and Human Services Commissioner, former head of United States Substance Abuse and Mental Health Services Administration; born in Ardmore in 1958.
- Charles Coe, two-time U.S. Amateur golf champion, World War II combat pilot
- Eric Fields (b. June 14, 1982), professional boxer
- Mark Gastineau, former All-Pro NFL defensive star for New York Jets, born in Ardmore in 1956
- Sylvan Goldman, inventor of the shopping cart; born in Ardmore in 1898.
- Jermaine Gresham, former tight end for Ardmore High School, the Oklahoma Sooners, and the Cincinnati Bengals and Arizona Cardinals
- Jake L. Hamon Sr., oil millionaire and murder victim
- John Hinckley Jr., man who shot former President Ronald Reagan in failed assassination attempt in 1981; Hinckley's father worked for a local oil company
- Columbus Marion Joiner, father of East Texas Oil Field of 1930s, resided in and about Ardmore from 1897 to 1926
- Terence C. Kern, United States District Judge (Northern District of Oklahoma)
- Walt Lamb, football player
- B. P. Loughridge, the first Ardmore High School graduate to become a Fulbright scholar; became a cardiovascular surgeon, author, and health care consultant in Tulsa
- Rue McClanahan (1934-2010), Emmy Award-winning actress, grew up in Ardmore and graduated from Ardmore High School
- Mazola McKerson (1921-2014), first African American mayor of the city, first female mayor of a city of more than 30,000 in the US
- Joe McQueen (1919–2019), jazz musician, was raised in Ardmore
- Tessie Mobley (1906 – 1990) an operatic soprano.
- Samuel Lloyd Noble (1896–1950), oilman and philanthropist, founder of Noble Corporation
- Maurkice Pouncey, center for the Pittsburgh Steelers, and his twin brother, Mike Pouncey, center for the Miami Dolphins and Los Angeles Chargers, were born in Ardmore in 1989.
- Rex Ryan, NFL head coach for Buffalo Bills and New York Jets, born in Ardmore in 1962; his twin brother is pro football coach Rob Ryan
- Russ Saunders, former fullback for Green Bay Packers
- Michael Schwab (designer) (born 1952), American graphic designer and illustrator.
- Sallie Lewis Stephens Sturgeon (c. 1870–1955), journalist, public health inspector, and social worker
- Tom Tipps, Oklahoma businessman and legislator
- Mauree Turner, Oklahoma politician
- Carolyn Warner, Arizona politician
- Cameron Todd Willingham (1968–2004), convicted of triple murder and arson; executed

== See also ==
- List of oil refineries
