= KVSO =

Radio station in Ardmore, Oklahoma

- Ardmore, Oklahoma; United States
- Frequency: 1240 kHz
- Branding: KVSO, The Sports Animal

Programming
- Format: Sports
- Affiliations: WWLS-FM Oklahoma City

Ownership
- Owner: Stephens Media Group; (SMG-Ardmore, LLC)
- Sister stations: KKAJ-FM, KYNZ, KTRX

History
- First air date: August 4, 1935
- Former call signs: KVSO (1935–1991); KKAJ (1991–1995)
- Former frequencies: 1210 kHz (1935–1941)
- Call sign meaning: "Voice of Southern Oklahoma"

Technical information
- Licensing authority: FCC
- Facility ID: 11182
- Class: C
- Power: 1,000 watts unlimited
- Transmitter coordinates: 34°10′54″N 97°8′48″W
- Translator: 107.5 K298CR (Ardmore)

Links
- Public license information: Public file; LMS
- Website: kvso.com

KVSO (1240 AM, "The Sports Animal") is a radio station broadcasting a sports format. Licensed to Ardmore, Oklahoma, United States, the station is currently owned by Stephens Media Group, through licensee SMG-Ardmore, LLC.

== History ==
On August 13, 1934, The Ardmoreite Publishing Company applied to build a new radio station on 1210 kHz in Ardmore, to operate with 100 watts during daytime hours. The Federal Communications Commission granted the application on February 26, 1935. The call sign KVSO was selected, for "Voice of Southern Oklahoma". Operating from studios and a transmitter at a converted two-story home north of the city that was once used as a showplace for local merchants, the station went on the air on August 4, 1935. It was Ardmore's first broadcast outlet since the short-lived WOAA in 1922 and 1923. While originally a daytime-only station, it was allowed to broadcast at night in 1936, and in January 1938, it increased power to 250 watts. In addition to local programs and World Broadcasting System features, the station also had newscasts, which originated from studios at the downtown printing plant and offices of The Ardmoreite. When an adjacent building burned down in March 1938, newscasters reporting the blaze from the downtown studio had to periodically flee the studios for fresh air because of smoke.

It was a charter member of the Oklahoma Network, itself affiliated with the Mutual Broadcasting System, when it was formed in 1937. Much of the Oklahoma Network joined NBC's Blue Network on January 1, 1941, resulting in the incorporation of five new Oklahoma outlets including KVSO. On March 29 of that year, the station moved from 1210 to 1240 kHz as part of the enactment of NARBA. Studios moved from the transmitter site to the downtown Hotel Ardmore in 1942.

In 1944, KVSO was separated into the personal ownership of John F. Easley, publisher of The Ardmoreite, and it would remain in the Easley and Riesen-Easley family into the 1980s. The station continued to steadily grow. An FM station, KVSO-FM 93.7, operated from 1947 until 1950, when it was closed down due to the expense of repairing its transmitter. The mountaintop site once used by the FM was rehabilitated in 1956 for use by KVSO-TV (channel 12), also an NBC affiliate, which was sold and became KXII in 1958.

The Riesen family sold the Ardmoreite to Stauffer Communications in 1983, ending 63 years of family ownership of the newspaper. Stauffer was required to divest the radio stations to meet FCC regulations. In buying the newspaper, the firm requested an 18-month waiver to take on the station (valued at $750,000), which would have brought it over the limit of AM outlets it could own, until a buyer could be sought. The buyer for the station was Harold G. McEwen, who also owned KKAJ (95.7 FM) in town. Both outlets sold together for $1.75 million to Pat Nugent in 1986. Under Nugent, KVSO programmed an oldies format.

The pair was to be sold again in 1991 to Carter County Broadcasting Inc., a company controlled by the First National Bank of Yorktown, Texas, but that sale failed to close. At that time, the AM station changed its call sign to KKAJ and began to simulcast the country music format on KKAJ-FM, replacing what had been a Christian format. Nugent would try again to sell the pair in 1993, this time to Chuckie Broadcasting, a company led by Lawrence B. Taishoff, the former publisher and chairman of Broadcasting magazine. The KVSO call letters were restored to the AM station in 1995, though it was not until 1996 that the station dropped the simulcast to broadcast an oldies and talk format. The present sports format was adopted in 2001. Chuckie Broadcasting was acquired by NextMedia for $5.5 million in 2002.

LKCM Radio Group purchased the stations from NextMedia in 2006. Stephens Media acquired the LKCM cluster in 2016.

== Programming ==
Most of the station's daytime sports talk programming is simulcast from WWLS-FM in Oklahoma City. The station also airs Oklahoma City Thunder basketball and Oklahoma Sooners athletic events.

== Translators ==
In the immediate Ardmore area, KVSO is simulcast on a 250-watt translator on the FM band.

Broadcast translator for KVSO
Call sign	Frequency	City of license	FID	ERP (W)	HAAT	Class	FCC info
K298CR	107.5 FM	Ardmore, Oklahoma	199993	250	58 m (190 ft)	D	LMS
