= KKAJ-FM =

Radio station in Davis, Oklahoma

- Davis, Oklahoma; United States
- Broadcast area: Ardmore, Oklahoma
- Frequency: 95.7 MHz
- Branding: Texoma Country 95.7 KKAJ

Programming
- Format: Country

Ownership
- Owner: Stephens Media Group; (SMG-Ardmore, LLC)
- Sister stations: KYNZ, KTRX, KVSO

Technical information
- Licensing authority: FCC
- Facility ID: 11181
- Class: C2
- ERP: 50,000 watts
- HAAT: 140 meters (460 ft)
- Transmitter coordinates: 34.39725°N 96.92131°W

Links
- Public license information: Public file; LMS
- Webcast: Listen live
- Website: kkaj.com

KKAJ-FM (95.7 FM) is a radio station airing an country music format licensed to Davis, Oklahoma, United States. The station is owned by Stephens Media Group, through licensee SMG-Ardmore, LLC.
