= Loughridge =

Loughridge is a surname. Notable people with the surname include:

- B. P. Loughridge (born 1935), American surgeon
- Dallas Loughridge (born 2004), Australian basketball player
- John Loughridge (1923–1981), Australian rules footballer
- Lavinia Loughridge (1930–2014), British nephrologist
- Lee Loughridge, American comics artist
- Mark Loughridge (born 1953), American businessman
- Robert McGill Loughridge (1809–1900), American Presbyterian missionary
- William Loughridge (1827–1889), American lawyer, judge and politician
