= Murray State College =

Community college in Tishomingo, Oklahoma, U.S.

Coordinates: 34°13′20″N 96°40′33″W

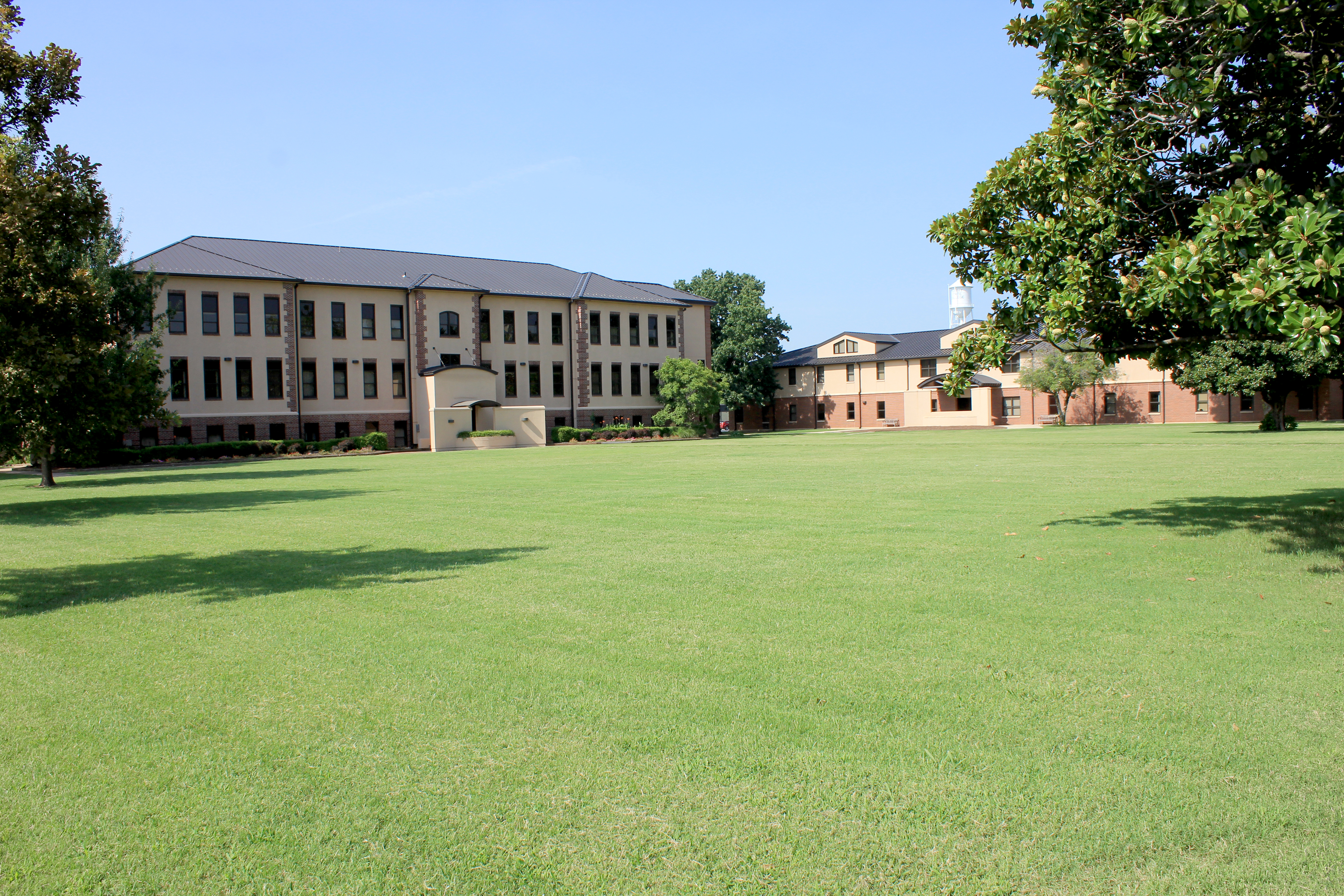
- Former name: Murray State School of Agriculture
- Type: Public community college
- Established: 1908
- President: Tim Faltyn
- Students: 2,686 (fall 2023)
- Location: Tishomingo, Oklahoma, U.S.
- Campus: Rural
- Sporting affiliations: NJCAA Division I
- Mascot: Aggies
- Website: www.mscok.edu

Murray State College is a public community college in south-central Oklahoma, with the main campus located in Tishomingo. It is named in honor of former Oklahoma Governor William H. "Alfalfa Bill" Murray.

Murray State College also maintains a smaller campus in Ardmore as one of four state higher-education institutions that participate at the University Center of Southern Oklahoma (the other three are Oklahoma State University, Southeastern State University, and East Central University).

Murray State College is home to the first and only bachelor of applied technology degree in gunsmithing in the U.S.

== History ==
Murray State College was established in 1908, in Tishomingo, Oklahoma, as the Murray State School of Agriculture in accordance with a law passed by the first Oklahoma Legislature. It was named after William H. Murray (known as "Alfalfa Bill"), who had served as legal advisor to Governor Douglas H. Johnston of the Chickasaw Nation, was his delegate to the 1905 convention to draft a constitution for the proposed State of Sequoyah, and was the president of the constitutional convention to draft a document to create the state of Oklahoma, admitted to the union in 1907.

The college's first students, numbering about 100, were primarily Chickasaw and Choctaw. At first, the students had to board with families in town, but Murray, then a US representative, in 1916 gained approval for federal funding to construct two dormitories for Native American students. On March 17, 1924, the Oklahoma Legislature approved a measure to authorize the institution to expand its curriculum to college-level course; it became a community college, granting its first associate degrees in 1924.

"Alfalfa Bill" Murray was elected as the ninth governor of the state in 1930. His nephew, Clive Murray, was appointed as president of the school in 1931 and served until 1961. The school was renamed in 1955 as Murray State Agricultural College. It was renamed again in 1967, as Murray State College of Agriculture and Applied Science, reflecting its expanded programs.

In 1972, the school was removed from the authority of the Board of Regents for Agricultural and Mechanical Colleges and a separate board of regents was appointed to manage it. At the time, the institution was renamed Murray State College.

== Academics ==
Murray State College offers associate of arts, associate of science, and associate of applied science degree programs. They also offer the first and only bachelor of applied technology degree in gunsmithing in the nation.

== Alumni ==
- Bill Anoatubby, governor of the Chickasaw Nation
- R. Perry Beaver, principal chief of the Muscogee (Creek) Nation (1996 until 2003), football coach at Jenks
- Johnston Murray, attorney, politician, and 14th governor of Oklahoma (1951-1955)
- U. L. Washington, Major League Baseball player

== See also ==
- List of colleges and universities in Oklahoma
