= University Center of Southern Oklahoma =

The University Center of Southern Oklahoma (formerly known as the Ardmore Higher Education Center) is a consortium-model higher education delivery system which provides academic degree programs from four participating institutions of higher education located in southern Oklahoma. Freshman through graduate courses are offered and students can earn college credits for the purposes of transfer to another college (for completing a degree), or students may complete their degree program on-site.

== Participating institutions ==
The four participating institutions for the University Center are:

- Murray State College, a community college located in Tishomingo, Oklahoma;
- East Central University, located in Ada, Oklahoma;
- Southeastern Oklahoma State University, located in Durant, Oklahoma; and
- Oklahoma State University–Oklahoma City (an academic unit of Oklahoma State University, which is located in Stillwater, Oklahoma).

== Institutional history ==
In 1974, the Oklahoma Legislature created a pilot higher education program called the Ardmore Higher Education Program (which eventually became the University Center of Southern Oklahoma) and housed it on the campus of Ardmore High School; 110 students enrolled in the first semester and chose from among ten college courses. By 1977, the pilot program was made permanent by statute and was placed under the administration of the Office of the Chancellor for Oklahoma Higher Education.

By the early 1980s, (due to increasing enrollment) a new building was constructed on property belonging to the Ardmore School District (funded, in part, from an endowment from the Noble Foundation). With more space, enrollment expanded to more than 750 students (with more than 90 college courses then available). At that time, the institution was formally known as the "Ardmore Higher Education Center."

In 1985 new legislation was passed and an independent governing Board of Trustees was established, with its members appointed by the Governor of Oklahoma.

Enrollment has continued to expand over the past two decades and, as of 2012, the institution provides educational opportunities to nearly 1,800 students (on average) per semester; the students have more than 300 courses from which to choose during the fall and spring semesters, and 90 during the summer session.

== Degree programs offered ==
UCSO offers degree programs in the following areas of academic study:

- Associate's degree;
- Bachelor's degree (criminal justice, business management, elementary education, counseling, and nursing); and
- Master's degree (business administration, education, human resources, and psychological services).

Students who do not pursue a degree may enroll in courses that further their professional credentials as elementary school teachers, school administrators, school psychologists, school psychometrists, and licensed professional counselors. All degree programs are fully accredited through one of the four participating colleges.

== See also ==
- East Central University
- Murray State College
- Southeastern Oklahoma State University
- Oklahoma State University–Oklahoma City
- Higher education
- Community college
- Ardmore, Oklahoma
