= KXII =

Television station in Sherman, Texas

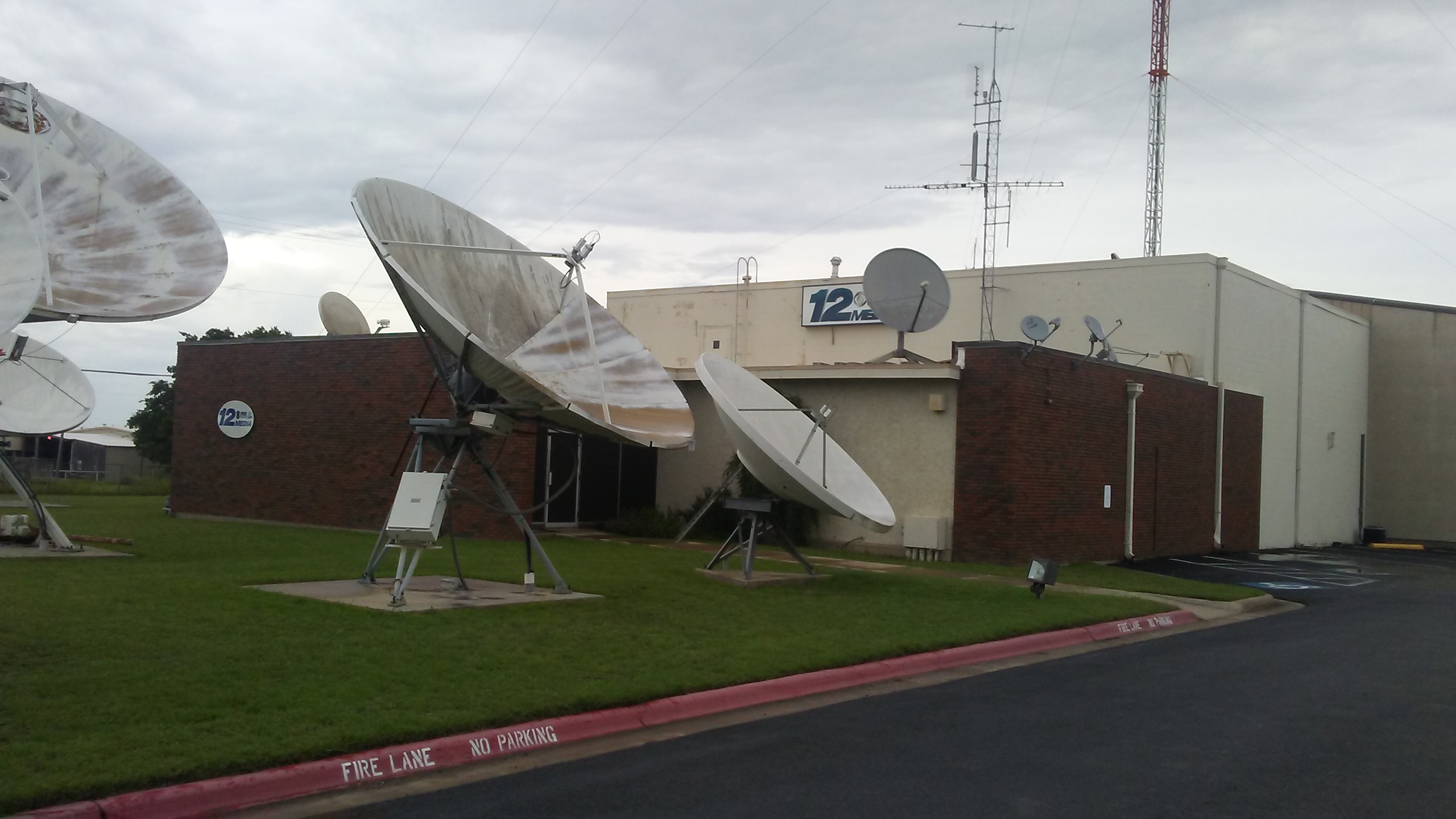
- KXII's studio facility on Texoma Parkway in Sherman.
- Sherman–Denison, Texas; Ada–Ardmore–Durant, Oklahoma; United States
- City: Sherman, Texas
- Channels: Digital: 12 (VHF); Virtual: 12
- Branding: KXII 12; KXII 12 News; My12 (12.2); Fox 12 (12.3)

Programming
- Affiliations: 12.1: CBS; 12.2: Independent with MyNetworkTV; 12.3: Fox; for others, see § Technical information and subchannels

Ownership
- Owner: Gray Media; (Gray Television Licensee, LLC)

History
- First air date: August 12, 1956
- Former call signs: KVSO-TV (1956–1958)
- Former channel numbers: Analog: 12 (VHF, 1956–2009); Digital: 20 (UHF, 1999–2009)
- Former affiliations: NBC (primary 1956–1977, secondary 1977–1985); CBS (secondary, 1960–1977)
- Call sign meaning: "XII" (Roman numeral 12)

Technical information
- Licensing authority: FCC
- Facility ID: 35954
- ERP: 36 kW
- HAAT: 545.5 m (1,790 ft)
- Transmitter coordinates: 34°1′58″N 96°48′1″W
- Translator(s): KXIP-LD 12 Paris, TX; KAQI-LD 28.2/.3 Sherman, TX

Links
- Public license information: Public file; LMS
- Website: www.kxii.com

KXII (channel 12) is a television station licensed to Sherman, Texas, United States, serving the Sherman, Texas–Ada, Oklahoma market as an affiliate of CBS, MyNetworkTV, and Fox. It is owned by Gray Media alongside low-power Telemundo affiliate KAQI-LD (channel 28). The two stations share studios on Texoma Parkway (SH 91) in northeastern Sherman, with an additional studio on South Commerce Street (US 77) and Elks Boulevard in southwestern Ardmore, Oklahoma. KXII's transmitter is located along US 377 in rural northeastern Marshall County, Oklahoma (southwest of Madill).

KXII's signal is relayed on low-power translator station KXIP-LD (channel 12) in Paris, Texas (in the Dallas–Fort Worth television market), and also on the second and third subchannels of KAQI-LD.

== History ==
=== Early history under Reisen-Easley ownership ===
The station first signed on the air as KVSO-TV, on August 12, 1956. Originally licensed to Ardmore, Oklahoma, it was founded by a family-led consortium led by Albert Riesen, Maurine Easley and their children, John and Buddy Riesen, and Betty Dillard. The Riesen-Easley family had assumed ownership of The Daily Ardmoreite and KVSO (1240 AM) from Maurine's father, John Easley—longtime owner of the newspaper/radio station combination, who had acquired the Ardmoreite in 1917—following his retirement the year prior.

After the family filed an application with the Federal Communications Commission (FCC) for the construction permit in 1954, the Reisen-Easleys obtained VHF channel 12 for their proposed television station after negotiating with Eastern Oklahoma Television, Inc., owner of Ada-based competitor KTEN (channel 10), for the allocation (the FCC had reassigned the channel 12 allocation to the Sherman–Ada market following the issuance of the Sixth Report and Order in 1952, in which the agency moved the same assignment from Waco to Abilene, Texas, where it would become occupied by present-day ABC affiliate KTXS-TV, to avoid interference with the Sherman-Ada frequency).

Channel 12 originally operated as an NBC affiliate; however the Riesen-Easley ownership group was unable to afford the expenditures to acquire a feed to access NBC's television programming directly; this forced station engineers to have to switch to and from the broadcast signal of NBC affiliate WKY-TV (now KFOR-TV) in Oklahoma City, whenever WKY aired programming from the network. In addition, KVSO-TV carried some of WKY's local and syndicated programming intermittently within its broadcast day. The station originally maintained transmitter facilities from a tower located north of Ardmore in the Arbuckle Mountains, on a site that also formerly housed the transmitter of KVSO-FM.

On April 2, 1957, the station's 360 feet (110 m) transmission tower was felled by a strong tornado (later retroactively rated as an F2) that touched down west of Dougherty and hit portions of northern Carter County, Oklahoma. Transmitter engineer Chester Rollins was near the tower at the time the tornado hit and escaped serious injury, despite the transmission building he was in losing its roof. The tower fell onto a pickup truck, which was shifted 75 yards (69 m), killing the male driver. The station set up temporary transmission facilities near its Ardmore studio, where its signal originated until the following year, when a new transmitter and tower was constructed near Madill (about 25 miles (40 km) southeast of Ardmore), in order to provide better reception to viewers in Durant and across the Red River to the Sherman–Denison, Texas area.

=== Texoma Broadcasting ownership ===
In late 1958, the Riesen family sold KVSO-TV to Texoma Broadcasting, a holding company owned by businessman Milford N. "Buddy" Bostick, who founded fellow CBS affiliate KWTX-TV in Waco, Texas three years earlier (The Daily Ardmoreite remained under the Riesens' ownership until 1983, when they sold the newspaper to Stauffer Communications). Shortly after the sale's closure, the station changed its call letters to KXII (signifying the Roman numeral for 12).

In the spring of 1960, channel 12 began maintaining a secondary affiliation with CBS. At that time, in addition to carrying the majority of NBC's programming lineup, CBS fare cleared to air on KVSO for most of the 1960s consisted mainly of daytime programs and sporting events (such as National Football League [NFL] game telecasts, including those involving the Dallas Cowboys). In 1960, the station opened a secondary studio facility located along U.S. Highway 75, halfway between Sherman and Denison (the building would later become the station's main studios in 1974). During the 1960s and early 1970s, most CBS programming was fed to cable subscribers in the Texoma area via the network's affiliates in surrounding markets, including KWTV in Oklahoma City, KAUZ-TV in Wichita Falls, and KRLD-TV (now Fox owned-and-operated station KDFW) in Dallas–Fort Worth. KXII's direct competitor, KTEN, was a primary ABC affiliate at the time but also carried select programming from NBC (mainly running programs that KXII did not give clearance to air) through a secondary affiliation.

Although KXII and KTEN were considered to be direct competitors, for many years, the coverage patterns of their respective signals differed considerably because of the 50-mile (80 km) distances between channel 12's transmitter in Madill and KTEN's transmission tower in Ada. As a result, viewers living in and surrounding areas of south-central Oklahoma located within a 25-mile (40 km) radius of the KXII transmitter (including the cities of Ardmore, Madill and Durant) experienced fair to poor reception of KTEN. In turn, channel 10 had marginal if not non-existent coverage in some adjoining areas of north-central Texas (including Sherman, Denison and Gainesville) that were able to receive KXII. In order to become more competitive with KXII, in 1983, the FCC granted Eastern Oklahoma Television a permit to construct a 1,059-foot-tall (323 m) tower between Milburn and Bromide, Oklahoma—which became operational the following year—to enable better over-the-air reception to areas of far southern Oklahoma near the Red River and extend its reach into the Sherman–Denison area and adjoining areas of north-central Texas (including Gainesville, Bonham, and Paris).

Former KXII logo, used from 2006 until November 2012.

In September 1974, KXII shifted the balance of network programming on its schedule to include a larger proportion of the CBS lineup, including most of the network's daytime shows, several prime time programs and most of its sports programming. This turned channel 12 into a hybrid station that carried almost half of NBC and CBS' respective programming inventories for the next few years. As KXII shifted its primary source of network programming from NBC to CBS in the mid-1970s, KTEN conversely added a larger proportion of NBC programs to its daytime and prime time schedules, evolving into a similar hybrid ABC/NBC station in the process. In 1974, KXII replaced NBC Nightly News with the CBS Evening News as the network newscast it carried as the lead-in to the station's 6 p.m. newscast. KXII's transitioned into a primary CBS station in January 1977; over the next eight years, the station steadily shed what NBC programming remained on its schedule. Also in 1977, KXII relocated its Ardmore facility from a building at Lincoln Center on West Main Street to one located on South Commerce Street (near US 77); this location remains in operation as a news bureau to gather stories for the Oklahoma side of the market, in conjunction with the main studio in Sherman. The station successfully petitioned the FCC to change its city of license from Ardmore to Sherman in 1992; this was done primarily to allow Grayson County to be classified as in its market for the first time in its history, taking it from the 178th-largest area of dominant influence to the 157th-largest.

In September 1985, channel 12 formally converted into an exclusive affiliate of CBS, after KTEN assumed the local rights to Today—the only NBC program that remained on KXII's schedule prior to that time—with the CBS Morning News replacing it as KXII's network morning news offering. (Even though it did not carry any NBC programs on its schedule over the nine subsequent years, TV Guide continued to identify KXII as a primary CBS/secondary NBC affiliate in the channel directory page of its Oklahoma City and North Texas editions until 1994.) The move concurrently resulted in KTEN shifting its primary affiliation to NBC, although it continued to air a reduced schedule of ABC programming and, in July 1994, added the majority of the Fox lineup (since KTEN became an exclusive NBC affiliate in September 1998, the primary feeds of the Sherman–Ada market's two commercial television stations have been represented by a single network affiliation; neither station would carry programming from any of the other major broadcast networks until KXII launched a UPN-affiliated digital subchannel in February 2006).

=== Gray Television ownership ===
On April 15, 1999, Atlanta-based Gray Communications Systems (now Gray Television) announced that it would acquire KXII, Waco sister station KWTX-TV and its semi-satellite KBTX-TV in Bryan, Texas, from Bostick's three holding companies—KXII Broadcasters, Inc., KWTX Broadcasting, Inc. and Brazos Broadcasting, Inc., respectively—for $139 million. The decision to sell the stations stemmed from recommendations by shareholders of the companies because of the costs that the Bostick companies would incur in launching and operating digital television signals for the three stations, with Gray CEO Hilton H. Howell Jr. (a shareholder in KWTX) inquiring about purchasing the stations after Bostick was initially unsuccessful in reaching sale agreements with prospective buyers. Through the transaction, which was finalized on October 1, 1999, Gray paid $41.5 million in cash as well as additional cash payments for certain accounts receivable to purchase channel 12 from Bostick-owned KXII Broadcasters Inc.

KXII was one of the few remaining commercial broadcast television outlets in the United States as well as the last major network affiliate station in Oklahoma and Texas to sign off the air during the overnight hours, occurring on Saturday nights/early Sunday mornings from 2:05 to 5 a.m. This continued until September 2009, when the station adopted a full 168-hour weekly schedule, filling the formerly vacant hours on early Sunday mornings with paid programming on its main channel and KXII-DT2 and a mix of syndicated and paid programming on KXII-DT3.

== KXII-DT3 ==
KXII-DT3, branded Fox 12, is the Fox-affiliated third digital subchannel of KXII, broadcasting in 720p high definition on channel 12.3.

This subchannel's history began in 2006 as the first full-time local Fox station for the Sherman-Denison market. Prior to the launch of KXII-DT3, KTEN (channel 10) served as a secondary affiliate of Fox starting in 1994 after the network had won the broadcast rights to carry National Football Conference games from the NFL, ending CBS' 37-year broadcast association with the conference. KTEN's owners had filed for bankruptcy at the time and gained additional monetary compensation from Fox, along with allowing KTEN the ability to show every single Dallas Cowboys game that was not available on cable television. However, this affiliation agreement resulted in the station becoming even more of a hybrid network affiliate as it already had a primary NBC affiliation and a secondary affiliation with ABC, in addition to carrying select Fox programs.

KTEN became an exclusive NBC affiliate in 1998, leaving the Sherman–Ada market without any local affiliates of ABC or Fox. Fox network programming was available in the market thereafter through cable via out-of-market stations from Oklahoma City (KOKH-TV, which is available over-the-air in northern parts of the market and was available on Cable One in Ada and Ardmore) and Dallas–Fort Worth (KDFW, which was available over-the-air in the portions of the southern part of the market and was available to Cable One subscribers in Sherman). The launch of the Fox subchannel occurred the same year that KTEN added a CW-affiliated subchannel and KXII added a subchannel affiliated with Fox's sister programming service, MyNetworkTV. As a result, the two station Ada–Sherman market is the only television market in the United States with all six broadcast networks—ABC (which returned to the market in 2010 on a third digital subchannel of KTEN), CBS, NBC, Fox, The CW and MyNetworkTV—carrying affiliations with only two commercial stations (both of which are full-power outlets).

Prior to September 2009, KXII-DT3 did not offer any locally produced programming exclusive to the subchannel, with the exception of severe weather coverage simulcast on both of the station's digital subchannels. KXII-DT3 carries special reports and most breaking news coverage produced by Fox News for carriage on Fox's affiliates. KXII also produces an occasional sports talk program seen on Friday nights titled Sports Overtime for KXII-DT3, the subchannel also carries KXII's public affairs program First News Forum.

== Programming ==
=== General programming ===
KXII clears the entire CBS network schedule; however, the station carries the CBS WKND block on Saturday mornings one hour earlier than most CBS affiliates, via the "live" network feed, as the station does not air a local morning newscast on weekends (allowing KXII to carry the full CBS Saturday morning schedule without deferring some programs within the block to open time periods to fulfill educational programming obligations in the event that CBS airs a late-morning college football or basketball game during the fall and winter months). Since the program's April 2014 expansion into a one-hour broadcast, the station has also aired Face the Nation in separate half-hour blocks; the first half-hour typically airs on Sunday mornings and the second half-hour airs in late night on each edition's original airdate to accommodate a ministry outreach program from the First Baptist Church of Sherman.

KXII-DT2 also serves as a backup CBS affiliate, carrying programming from that network normally seen on the main channel, when KXII's main channel broadcasts breaking news or severe weather coverage; the subchannel also simulcasts severe weather coverage from the main channel when wall-to-wall coverage is warranted.

=== Sports programming ===
KXII began serving as the Sherman-Ada market's primary television station for the Dallas Cowboys as a CBS affiliate in 1962, when the network obtained the television rights to the National Football League (NFL). The station carried most regional or national Cowboys game telecasts aired by CBS until its contractual rights to the National Football Conference (NFC) concluded in 1993 (the team's over-the-air game telecasts aired locally on KTEN during that station's tenure as a part-time Fox affiliate from 1994 to 1998). Channel 12 resumed its status as the Cowboys' primary local broadcaster following the launch of its Fox-affiliated DT3 subchannel in September 2006.

Unlike Fox-owned KDFW in Dallas–Fort Worth (which served as the market's previous Fox station from 1998 to 2006), Cowboys game telecasts on KXII and KXII-DT3 were not subject to blackouts under league rules in effect until the NFL eliminated its in-market blackout restrictions in 2014, which prohibited television stations within a team's designated market area from airing games involving a local NFL franchise in the event that any available tickets remained unsold (most of the Sherman–Ada market, with the exception of southwestern Grayson County, Texas, is located outside of the NFL's designated blackout radius for the Cowboys' market area). Although this rule allowed a network to substitute another NFL game in place of the Cowboys broadcast, this issue was moot as tickets for the team's games have sold out, regardless of the Cowboys' season-to-season performance, since the early 1990s. KXII also carries telecasts of Cowboys regular season games involving either an American Football Conference (AFC) opponent or, since 2014, cross-flexed games declined by Fox that involve opponents in the NFC.

KXII-DT2 currently airs NBA games involving the Dallas Mavericks that are produced by Dallas independent station KTXA. From 2006 to 2014, the subchannel also carried Big 12 Conference college basketball games distributed by ESPN Regional Television (through its ESPN Plus/Big 12 Network syndication service).

== News operation ==
As of September 2016, KXII presently broadcasts 22 hours of locally produced newscasts each week (with four hours each weekday, and one hour each on Saturdays and Sundays). The station also produces 3 1/2 hours of locally produced newscasts each week for KXII-DT3 (with a half-hour each on weekdays, Saturdays and Sundays), in addition to simulcasting KXII's weekday morning newscast on the Fox affiliate. In addition, KXII produces the community affairs program News 12 Forum, which airs on Sundays at 6 a.m.

The station's news department began operations with the August 1956 sign-on of the then-KVSO-TV, which was originally based out of the station's original studio facilities in Ardmore. Because of KXII's status as the only major-network affiliate licensed to a city on the Texas side of the Sherman–Ada market, the balance of the stories featured on the station's newscasts tend to lean toward those affecting Sherman, Denison and surrounding areas of north-central Texas, albeit with a nearly equal focus on stories occurring in south-central Oklahoma. Among the market's two local television news operations, KXII has maintained ratings dominance in all time slots.

In December 1987, former KXII anchor Tyler Watson filed a lawsuit against the city of Calera, Oklahoma, Bryan County and former police officer John Bullard; Watson sought $325,000 in damages after she was bitten repeatedly by a Rottweiler owned by the Calera Police Department officer, while interviewing Bullard for a story about the K-9 program in March of that year, which required Watson to get more than 80 stitches on her face and head. The incident led to the suspension of the police dogs from active duty, and drug programs in which the dogs were to participate being canceled (the Calera City Council also ordered police chief Jack Stockton not to use the dogs or transport them outside the city limits). The suit alleged that Bullard told Watson that the dog would only attack on command or otherwise provoked, with the ex-officer claiming that he did not witness the attack.

In 1995, KXII began utilizing "Doppler 12", a Doppler weather radar system based near the Madill transmitter site for use in weather forecast segments within its newscasts and severe weather cut-ins; the radar system integrates the data from KXII's radar with NEXRAD data from National Weather Service radars located near Dallas, Texas, Oklahoma City and Frederick, Oklahoma, and Fort Smith, Arkansas. In September 2001, the station began carrying a local weekday morning newscast, when it premiered the initially 60-minute news program First News AM, which evolved out of local news inserts that it aired during the early-morning CBS Morning News network newscast. Debuting as an hour-long broadcast from 6 to 7 a.m., the program—which debuted ten years after KTEN debuted its own morning show, Mornin' Cup (now KTEN News Today)—expanded to 90 minutes (starting at 5:30 a.m.) in January 2006, with an extra five minutes being added to the program two years later following the retirement of longtime anchor Norman Bennett; the morning newscast was retitled News 12 AM in 2013, at which point it expanded into a two-hour broadcast at 5 a.m.

On September 18, 2006, KXII debuted a new set for its newscasts designed by San Diego–based FX Group, which replaced a set that had previously been in use by the station since 1995 (the set, which also includes separate areas for sports specials and segments as well as an update desk for breaking news alerts, was updated with new duratrans in November 2015, at which point the station also began using new cuts from its existing music package, Gari Media Group's "The CBS Enforcer Music Collection"). Along with the new set, the station concurrently adopted a new graphics package, and also remodeled its Ardmore studio to incorporate a working newsroom set that allows viewers to see staff at the Ardmore bureau compile reports for the newscasts.

In September 2009, KXII began producing a five-minute-long news and weather segment at 9 p.m. for Fox-affiliated KXII-DT3; the weeknight-only program, originally titled First News at Nine; it used the same evening anchor staff as that seen on KXII's main channel. The newscast used the same news set and theme music as KXII's main channel for its newscasts. On April 20, 2010, KXII became the first television station in the Ada–Sherman market (and the third station in Oklahoma, behind KFOR-TV in Oklahoma City and KJRH-TV in Tulsa) to begin broadcasting its local newscasts in high definition; the KXII-DT3 newscast was included in the upgrade, which saw cameras and broadcast equipment at the Sherman and Ardmore studios being upgraded to allow the gathering, production and dissemination of high-definition video content.

News programming on KXII-DT3 expanded on August 26, 2011, when KXII debuted a half-hour, weeknight-only newscast at 5:30 p.m. and expanded the 9 p.m. newscast to a half-hour (the former, which was canceled in September 2016, was intended to provide a local alternative to the national early evening news programs seen on the Big Three networks; the latter, prime time newscast competes against network programming on ABC, NBC and CBS and was also developed as a competitor to a KTEN-produced prime time newscast on CW-affiliated KTEN-DT3 that premiered in September 2006). Originally branded as Fox Texoma News, the Fox newscasts—which originate from a secondary set at KXII's Texoma Parkway facility in Sherman—were unified under the station's primary News 12 branding in 2012. "News 12 at Nine" is now a full 30-minute weeknight newscast and regularly wins its timeslot for local news. Subsequently, on April 29, 2013, KXII began producing an hour-long weekday morning newscast at 7 a.m., titled News 12 Good Day, which competed against CBS This Morning on the station's main channel (Good Day was canceled in September 2015 due to low viewership, with KXII-DT3 concurrently adding a simulcast of News 12 AM).

== Technical information and subchannels ==
Logo for CBS subchannel

Logo for MyNetworkTV subchannel

Logo for Fox subchannel

KXII transmits from a tower along US 377 in rural northeastern Marshall County, Oklahoma (southwest of Madill). The station's signal is multiplexed:

Subchannels of KXII and KXIP-LD
Channel	Res.	Short name	Programming
12.1	1080i	KXIICBS	CBS
12.2	720p	KXIIMYT	Independent with MyNetworkTV
12.3	720p	KXIIFOX	Fox
12.4	480i	KXIIION	Ion
12.5	480i	KXIIGRI	Grit
12.6	480i	KXIIOUT	Outlaw

=== Analog-to-digital conversion ===
KXII launched a digital signal on UHF channel 20 in May 2002. In 2006, with the installation of DiviCom MPEG-2 high definition and standard definition encoders, statistical multiplexing equipment and software from broadcast equipment manufacturer Harmonic Inc. at its master control facility, KXII became the first television station in the world to transmit two HD channels and one SD channel over a 6 MHz digital bandwidth feed; the equipment allowed the station to transmit MyNetworkTV-affiliated KXII-DT2 in 480i SD and Fox-affiliated KXII-DT3 in 720p HD, as complementary feeds to its main HD signal.

KXII ended regular programming on its analog signal, over VHF channel 12, on February 6, 2009, two weeks prior to the original target date on which full-power television stations in the United States were to transition from analog to digital broadcasts under federal mandate (which a Congressional resolution later delayed to June 12, in order to allow additional time for viewers reliant on over-the-air television service to obtain digital tuning equipment). The station's digital signal relocated from its pre-transition UHF channel 20 to VHF channel 12 for post-transition operations.
