= Black Theater of Ardmore =

- U.S. National Register of Historic Places
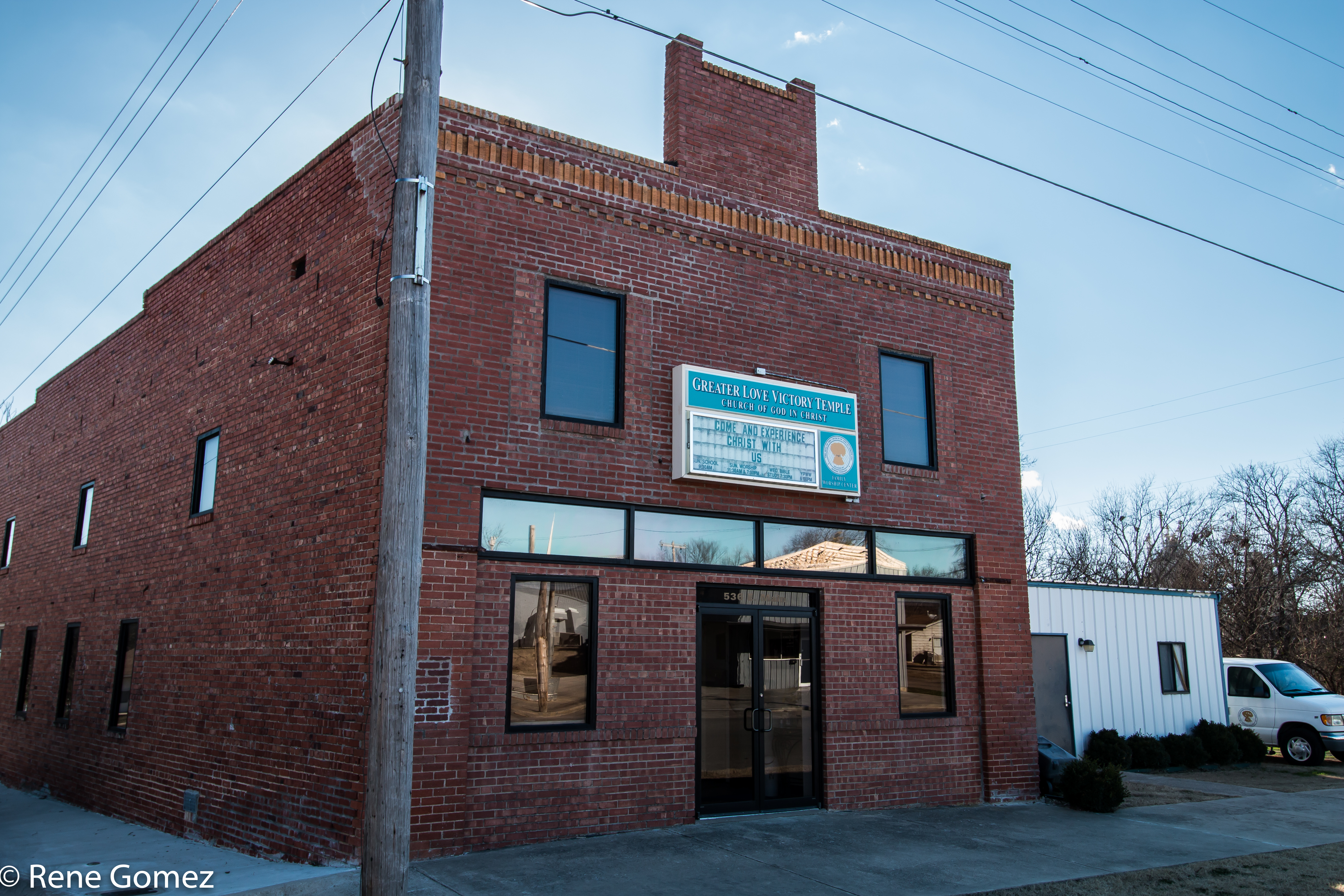

- Location within Oklahoma Location within the United States
- Location: Ardmore, Oklahoma
- Coordinates: 34°10′13″N 97°7′22″W
- Built: 1922
- NRHP reference No.: 84002978
- Added to NRHP: June 22, 1984

The Black Theater of Ardmore is a historic theater building in Ardmore, Oklahoma, United States. It was built in 1922 during a time of racial segregation, when Ardmore's community of more than 2,000 African American residents had its own business district and its own residential area. The theater provided entertainment for black residents who were excluded from patronizing white theaters. It is also a symbol to the once-thriving black business district of Ardmore. It functioned as a theater until 1944, when it was sold to the Metropolitan African Methodist Episcopal Church. The building is listed on the National Register of Historic Places.
