= B. P. Loughridge =

American cardiovascular surgeon and author

Billy Paul Loughridge
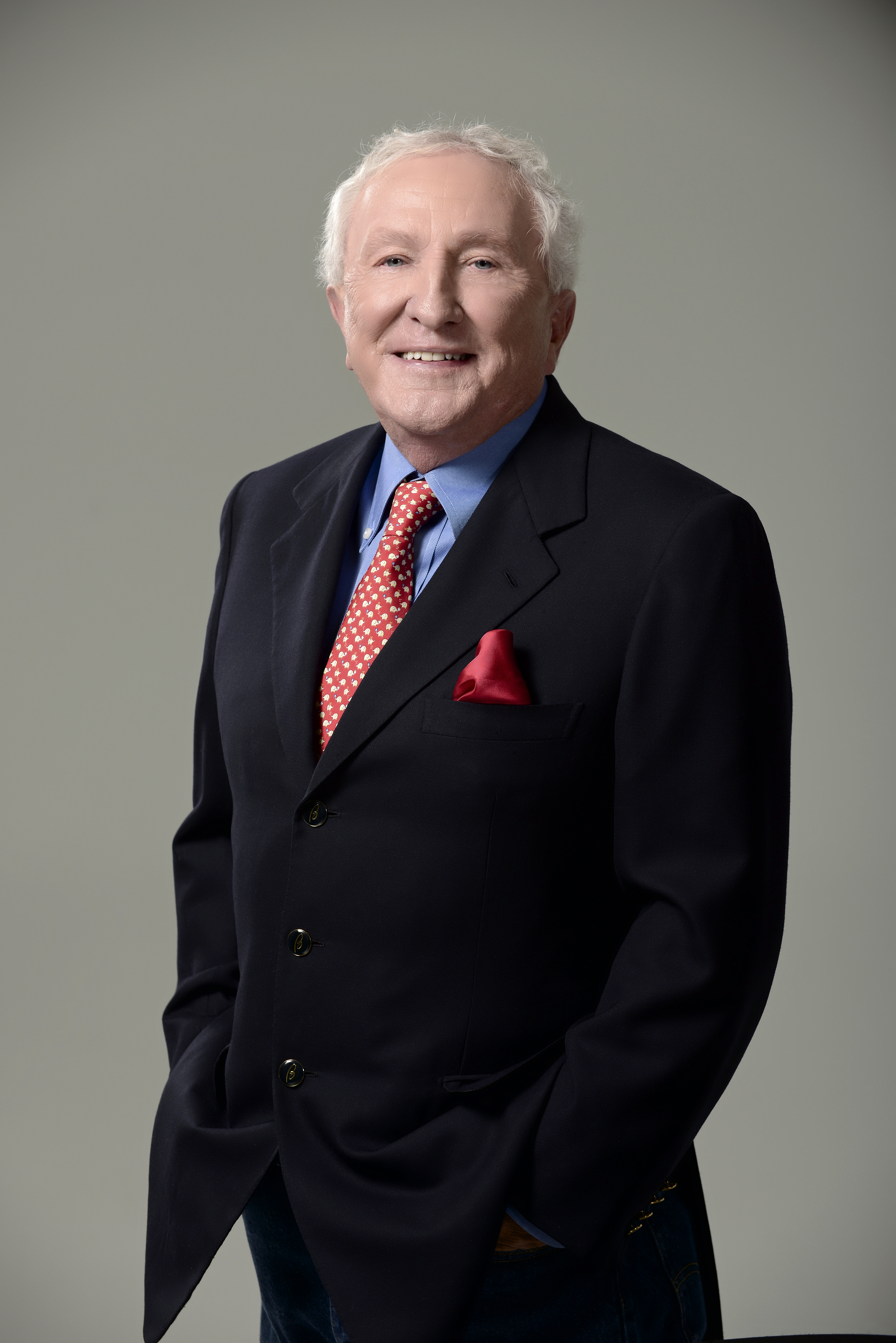
- Born: April 19, 1935 (age 91) Tuck's Ferry, Oklahoma
- Died: August 28, 2023
- Occupation: Cardiovascular surgeon Author; Health care consultant
- Education: Doctor of Medicine; Bachelor of Arts
- Alma mater: University of Oklahoma School of Medicine

Billy Paul Loughridge (born April 19, 1935) is a cardiovascular surgeon, author, and health care consultant in Tulsa, Oklahoma. He practiced cardiovascular surgery in Tulsa, Oklahoma from 1967 until 1998. During this period he performed more than 10,000 surgeries. He also taught in medical schools, supervised surgery at two hospitals, wrote three books, and served as an expert witness in numerous legal cases involving medical issues. In the 1970s he worked for four years with engineers at a company which makes oil pumping equipment in an unsuccessful attempt to create an artificial heart. Beyond his medical practice, Loughridge was involved in numerous charitable, scientific, and cultural institutions, as a donor, board member, trustee, and officer.

== Biography ==
=== Background, youth, and early education ===
Some of Loughridge's ancestors moved to Oklahoma from Georgia when it was the Indian Territory. The most prominent of these was Rev. Robert McGill Loughridge, a Presbyterian minister who came to the Indian Territory as a missionary in 1843. In 1890 Reverend Loughridge was the co-author and publisher of the first English-Muscogee (Creek) dictionary. His maternal great-grandfather, John Martin Tuck, operated a ferry on the Red River south of Marietta, Oklahoma in the late nineteenth century. Loughridge's father, William Floyd Loughridge was born in 1915 in New Mexico where the family was homesteading. However, by the 1920s facing dire poverty, they moved back to Oklahoma, where Loughridge's grandfather was a truck driver and farmed a small plot of land outside of Ardmore. B.P.'s mother, Elizabeth (Shorter) Loughridge, was born in Oklahoma in 1916. Both his parents grew up in Ardmore, but were only able to attend school until the eighth grade. After their marriage, during the Great Depression, William Floyd and Elizabeth moved to a farm owned by Elizabeth's family at Tuck's Ferry on the Red River in southern Oklahoma. Both B.P. and his older sister Floydena were born in a farmhouse at Tuck's Ferry, and spent their early years there. When B.P. was born (1935) tens of thousands of Oklahoma farmers were moving west, driven from their land by the Dust Bowl. Floyd and Elizabeth Loughridge did not move to California but when B.P. reached school age his parents moved back to Ardmore, because it could provide their son and daughter with greater educational opportunities. Loughridge and his sister were the first high school graduates in his immediate family.

At Ardmore High School he lettered in football as a defensive back. A determined, if not overly talented athlete, he became a Golden Gloves boxer, reaching the state quarter finals as a lightweight. While in high school and college he was also an amateur bull rider. For his fortieth birthday Loughridge participated in his final rodeo, riding a bull for six seconds. However, academics, not sports, were his real forte. Loughridge graduated from Ardmore High School in 1953, and would later be the first graduate of that school to hold a Fulbright Fellowship for study abroad. After graduating high school he entered the University of Oklahoma at Norman, intending to become a physician. In his first year, he worked as dish washer and server in exchange for room and board. Unlike most pre-med students at the time, Loughridge majored in sociology, because of his interests in social issues and his understanding that medicine could not be disconnected from the larger society. However, he had minors in both chemistry and zoology to prepare for medical school. At the University of Oklahoma he joined the Sigma Chi fraternity. Some four decades later he would be honored as a "Significant Sig" for his lifetime achievements.

He graduated from college in the spring of 1957 and that fall entered the University of Oklahoma School of Medicine in Oklahoma City. He financed his medical education with loans from the Kellogg Foundation, washing glassware at night at the Oklahoma Medical Research Foundation, and working as an exterminator for a pest control company. He finished medical school in 1961 and shortly after graduation married Linda Faye Harrell (April 24, 1940 – August 16, 2012), who finished her undergraduate education at the University of Oklahoma that year. Their marriage would last more than half a century, until her death in 2012. After their three children were grown, Linda Faye focused her energies on charitable work with cultural institutions, like the Tulsa Philharmonic and Tulsa Opera, the Tulsa Junior League, and medical charities. She raised more than 1.5 million dollars for St. John Hospital in Tulsa, Oklahoma.

=== Early medical career ===
Following his graduation from medical school, Dr. Loughridge was an intern at the University of Texas Medical Center in Galveston (1961–62). He then spent four years (1962–66) as a general surgical resident at the University of Oklahoma Medical Center in Oklahoma City. In 1964, while still a resident at the University of Oklahoma Medical Center, Loughridge received a fellowship from the National Institute of Health (NIH) to conduct cardiovascular research. As an NIH Fellow he was one of the pioneering researchers working on the development of artificial tissue valves in heart surgery. Loughridge published the results of this research in the Surgical Forum in 1965. During this residency Loughridge was the co-author of three other published scholarly articles.

Loughridge's scholarship led him to Sahlgrenska University in Gothenburg, Sweden, as a Fulbright scholar in 1966–67. Before he headed to Sweden Loughridge, reflecting common understandings of socialized medicine in the US at the time, suggested that socialized medicine was leading to a decline in the number of men becoming physicians in that country. But Loughridge also noted that medical residence "earn a higher salary" in Sweden than in the US, and that the medical case was as good as in the United States. He also noted that while Sweden he would probably have a higher standard of living there than he did as a resident in the United States. While in Sweden Loughridge did research on liver transplant techniques with Dr. Steg Bengmark, who would go on to be one of the world's experts on liver surgery and the founder of the World Association of HPB. The research from Loughridge's Fulbright year demonstrated that a patient could survive with removal of up to 95 per cent of the liver, and that over time the liver would regenerate to its original size. The Sahlgresnska team also developed techniques for killing cancer cells by cutting off arterial blood supply to the liver. This research was published in articles that appeared in the Annals of Surgery (1968), Acta Hepato-splenologica (1970), and the Journal of the Oklahoma Medical Association (1968). This work and research remains the basis of some modern surgical treatment for liver cancer.

Upon his return from Sweden, Loughridge joined Cardiovascular Surgery, Inc., an existing surgical practice in Tulsa, Oklahoma founded by Dr. Albert Lauck Shirkey (1933–2009). Loughridge and Shirkey would team up to perform the first heart value replacement surgeries in eastern Oklahoma. They also worked on creating an artificial heart in cooperation with the Byron Jackson Pump, Company. He also enlisted in the U.S. Air Force Reserves, and served as a medical officer from 1968 to 1971, achieving the rank of major. In 1971–72 Loughridge moved to Syracuse, New York where he served as a Senior Resident in Thoracic Surgery at the State University of New York Upstate Medical University. There he worked with the renowned thoracic surgeon and researcher Dr. Watts R. Webb. Before moving to Upstate Medical, Webb had served as the president of the Southern Thoracic Surgical Association. While working under Webb, Loughridge perfected his skills, techniques, and knowledge of cardiac and thoracic surgery.

=== Tulsa career ===
In 1972 Loughridge returned to Tulsa, and founded Thorasic and Cardiovascular Surgery, Inc., which he would head until shortly before his retirement in 1998. to begin what was to become more than a quarter of a century of practice specializing in heart, chest, and vascular surgery. In this practice he would perform more than 10,000 surgeries. In 1974 the American College of Cardiology elected Loughridge as a fellow. Two years later he was elected president of the Tulsa chapter of the American Heart Association. During this period he worked on the development of an artificial heart. In addition to his busy medical practice, Loughridge served as a professor of surgery at the Tulsa campus of the University of Oklahoma School of Medicine and at Oral Roberts University School of Medicine. Loughridge's partner, Albert Shireky also taught there. Loughridge was the Chief of Thoracic and Cardiovascular Surgery at two of Tulsa's main hospitals, St. John Hospital and at St. Francis Hospital. He continued to present his research and summaries of his work at various medical conventions. Shortly before he retired from active surgery, he began to serve as an expert witness in legal controversies involving medical issues.

When not practicing medicine, Loughridge was active in numerous civic, cultural and scientific organizations. He was president of the Tulsa Chapter of the American Heart Association, served on the Board of Trustees of Oral Roberts University, the Philbrook Museum of Art, and Camp Loughridge, a summer day camp for underprivileged children named for his great-granduncle, Rev. Robert Loughridge.

In 1998 he retired from active medical practice, but continued to be involved in medical research, working as an expert witness, and consulting. He also continues to provide primary medical care on a volunteer basis for indigent patients through Catholic Charities of Tulsa. In 2010 he was appointed to the board of directors of the Oklahoma Medical Research Foundation, which funds medical research worldwide. As a medical student, Dr. Loughridge had been employed by the foundation as a laboratory assistant to wash the test tubes, beakers, and other scientific glassware used by the center.

== Publications ==
=== Journal articles and presentations ===
- Williams, G. R., Loughridge, B. P., Price, W. E., Campbell, G. S. 1964. "Iliofemoral Vein Thrombosis." Journal of the Oklahoma State Medical Association 37:143–145.
- Roberts, L. B., Loughridge, B. P., Williams, G. R. 1964. "Relationship Between Lung Distensibility Pulmonary Blood Flow and Pulmonary Blood Volume." Surgical Forum 18:181–183.
- Loughridge, B.P., Bottomley, Richard, Williams, G. R. 1965. "Effect of Isolated in vivo Perfusion of the Canine Liver with 5-Fluorouracil." (Abstract). Clinical Research 13:48, OCLC 17526687.
- Loughridge, B. P., Shadid, E. A., Seetapun, Anun, Williams, G. R. 1965. "The Use of Fibrocollagenous Tissue as Cardiac Valve Replacement." Surgical Forum 16.
- Almersjo, O., Bengmark, S., Engevik, L., Hafstrom, L. O. Loughridge, B. P., Nilsson, L.A.V. 1968. "Serum Enzyme Changes after Hepatic Dearterialization in Man." Annals of Surgery 167(1).
- Loughridge, B. P., Amersjo, O., Hafstrom, L. O., Benjmark, S. 1968. "Dearterialization of the Liver in Malignant Metastatic Disease." Journal of the Oklahoma State Medical Association 61(5): 207–211.
- Bengmark, S. Hafstrom, L. O., Loughridge, B.P., KorasaBengtsen, K. 1970. "Changes in Coagulation Factors after Hepatic Artery Ligation in Dogs." Acta Hepato-splenologica 17(6).
- Slagle, R. C. Loughridge, B.P., Conrad, L.L., Hawkins, H.M., Brewer, D.L., Kalbfleisch, J. M. 1977. "Early Coronary Artery Bypass after Non-intramural Myocardial Infarction." Presented at OSIM-ACP Annual Meeting, 1977.
- Loughridge, B.P., Lain, K.C., Brown, S.H., Shirkey, A.L. 1980. "Complications Following Use of Intra-aortic Balloon Cardiac-assist Device." Presented Oklahoma State Medical Association.
- Loughridge, B.P. 1984. "Anatomic Variations of Great Vessel Arteriosclerotic Vascular Disease." Exhibit at Oklahoma State Medical Association.
- Loughridge, B.P., Basta, Lofty. 1985. "Percutaneous Balloon Coronary Angioplasty vs. Coronary Artery Bypass Grafting." Presented Oklahoma State Medical Association.
- Loughridge, B.P. 1988. "Treatment of Thoracic Aortic Aneurysms." Presented St. John's Cardiovascular Institute Annual Symposium.

=== Books ===
- Loughridge, B.P. 2000. The Cardiac Surgeon's Diet and Health Design. Health Design.
- ——. 2002. Every Breath You Take. Health Design.
- ——. 2011. Ticker: A User Guide for Everyone with a Heart. Health Design.

== Honors and professional affiliations ==
=== Special honors ===
- Fulbright Scholarship for Surgical Research (Gothenburg, Sweden)
- Past President, American Heart Association (Tulsa Oklahoma Chapter)
- Significant Sig, Sigma Chi (2001)
- Heart of Tulsa Award, American Heart Association February 2018

=== Professional society affiliations ===
- American College of Chest Physicians
- American Medical Association
- Oklahoma State Medical Association
- Tulsa County Medical Society
- Fellow, American College of Surgeons
- Fellow, American College of Cardiology
- Society of Thoracic Surgeons
- Southern Thoracic Surgical Association
- Fellow, International College of Surgeons
- Society of Vascular Surgeons
