= KYNZ =

Radio station in Lone Grove, Oklahoma

- Lone Grove, Oklahoma; United States
- Broadcast area: Ardmore, Oklahoma
- Frequency: 107.1 MHz
- Branding: Classic Hits 107.1

Programming
- Format: Classic hits

Ownership
- Owner: Stephens Media Group; (SMG-Ardmore, LLC)

History
- First air date: May 25, 1988; 37 years ago (on 106.7)
- Former frequencies: 106.7 MHz (1988–2002)

Technical information
- Licensing authority: FCC
- Facility ID: 58333
- Class: C3
- ERP: 24,500 watts
- HAAT: 102 meters (335 ft)
- Transmitter coordinates: 34°17′52″N 97°9′12″W

Links
- Public license information: Public file; LMS
- Webcast: Listen Live
- Website: kynz.com

KYNZ (107.1 FM) is a radio station licensed to Lone Grove, Oklahoma, United States. The station is currently owned by Stephens Media Group, through licensee SMG-Ardmore, LLC.
