= Oklahoma State University–Oklahoma City =

Public university in Oklahoma City, Oklahoma, US

Coordinates: 35°28′31″N 97°34′55″W

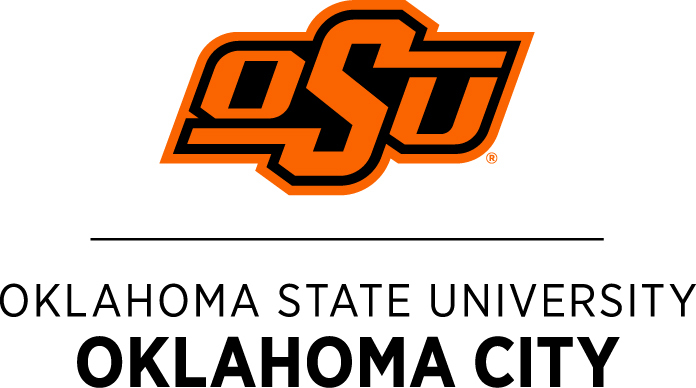
- Former names: Oklahoma State University Technical Institute (1961-1990)
- Type: Public
- Established: 1961; 65 years ago
- Provost: Dr. Ronna J. Vanderslice
- Students: 4,134 (fall 2023)
- Location: Oklahoma City, Oklahoma, United States
- Campus: Urban, 110 acres (0.45 km^{2})
- Colors: Orange & Black
- Website: osuokc.edu

Oklahoma State University–Oklahoma City (OSU-OKC) is a public university in Oklahoma City, Oklahoma. It is part of the Oklahoma State University System. Founded in 1961 as a branch of Oklahoma State University–Stillwater, its name changed from Oklahoma State University Technical Institute to its current designation in 1990. The school offers more than 40 degrees and/or certificates. Classes are held weekdays and weeknights, on-campus, online and hybrid, with intersession courses available. The university is accredited by the Higher Learning Commission.

== Academics ==
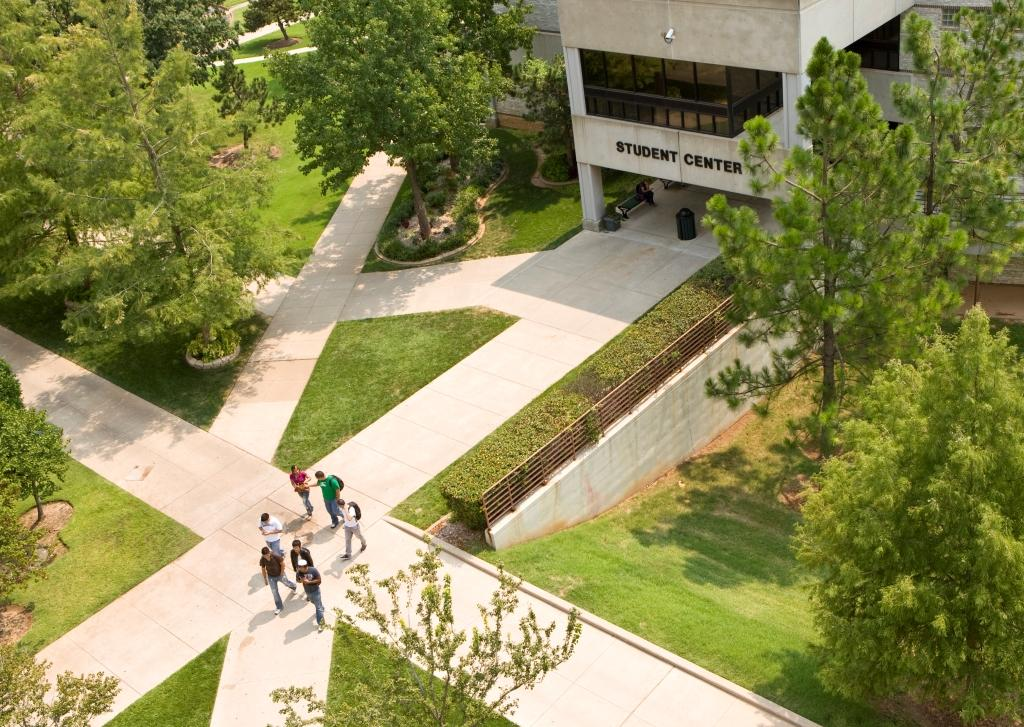
Student Learning Resource Center on campus

The academic divisions at OSU-OKC are made up of four schools: the School of Health Sciences; the School of Human Services; the School of Professional Studies; and the School of Science, Technology, Engineering and Mathematics. OSU-OKC offers bachelor's and associate degrees, as well as certificate programs.

== Leadership ==
As part of the OSU System, OSU-OKC is under the purview of the university president. Campus leadership has changed over time, but is currently led by a provost, Dr. Ronna J. Vanderslice.

OSU-OKC Leadership
Name	Birth-Death	Role	Term of Service
Philip Prescott Chandler	July 27, 1924 – Nov. 22, 2003	Director	1961 – 1985
Dr. James E. Hooper	April 10, 1937 – Aug. 19, 2022	Provost, Vice President	1985 – 1997
Dr. Jerry Dale Carroll	Jan. 2, 1940 – Oct. 29, 2010	President	1997 – 2010
Dr. Natalie Sue Shirley	Living	President	2011 – 2017
Dr. Bradford Williams	Living	President	2018 – 2021
Dr. Gregory Scott Newman	Living	President	2021 – 2023
Dr. Ronna Jean Vanderslice	Living	Provost	2024 – present
