= East Central University =

Public university in Ada, Oklahoma, US

- Former names: East Central State Normal School (1909–1939); East Central State College (1939–1974); East Central Oklahoma State University (1974–1985)
- Type: Public university
- Established: 1909; 117 years ago
- Parent institution: Regional University System of Oklahoma
- Academic affiliations: Space-grant
- Endowment: $35,564,099
- President: Wendell L. Godwin
- Provost: Jeffery Gibson
- Administrative staff: 422
- Students: 3,577 (2019)
- Location: Ada, Oklahoma, U.S. 34°46′28″N 96°39′53″W
- Campus: College town
- Colors: Black and orange
- Nickname: Tigers
- Sporting affiliations: Great American Conference
- Mascot: Roary the Tiger
- Website: ecok.edu
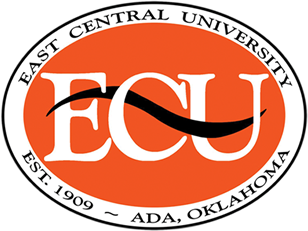

East Central University (ECU or East Central) is a public university in Ada, Oklahoma. It is part of Oklahoma's Regional University System. Beyond its flagship campus in Ada, the university has courses available in McAlester, Shawnee, and Durant, as well as online courses. Founded as East Central State Normal School in 1909, its present name was adopted in 1985. Some of its more prominent alumni include former Microsoft COO B. Kevin Turner, Modernist painter Leon Polk Smith, former NFL player Mark Gastineau, past governors Robert S. Kerr and George Nigh, former U.S. Representative Lyle Boren, Oklahoma Supreme Court Justice Tom Colbert, and U.S. Army General James D. Thurman.

ECU is approximately 90 miles (140 km) from Oklahoma City, 115 miles (185 km) from Tulsa and 150 miles (240 km) from Dallas. Today the campus consists of 37 buildings on 135 acres (55 ha); the university typically enrolls more than 3,500 students per semester from more than 30 countries and 25 states.

== History ==
The university was founded as East Central State Normal School in 1909, two years after Oklahoma was admitted as the 46th U.S. state. It was one of the six newly created state funded normal schools that were designed to provide four years of "preparatory" (or high school) study, followed by two years of college work towards teacher certification. The school's establishment was the product of the intense lobbying efforts of the 25,000 Club, a local booster group. The club raised funds for faculty salaries so classes could begin that fall in local churches and public school classrooms. Graduates of the normal school program received lifetime teaching certification statewide. The 1910 Oklahoma Legislature funded faculty salaries and the construction of a building on a 16-acre (65,000 m^{2}) site donated by a Chickasaw allottee. In 1919, the normal schools were authorized by the Oklahoma Legislature to offer four years of teacher education, to offer bachelor's degrees, and were designated teachers' colleges.

From 1910 to 1960, East Central operated Horace Mann Training School, a teacher education program. From its inception, the training school focused on elementary and junior high students. In 1925, Horace Mann added older students. In 1953, a new Horace Mann building was completed where the program was housed until Horace Mann Training School was discontinued in 1960.

Expanding beyond education degrees, in 1939 the school became "East Central State College". Fifteen years later, the regional colleges were allowed to offer graduate degrees. By 1974, the state legislature renamed the state colleges, and it became "East Central Oklahoma State University"—a name it retained until 1985 when it gained its present name.

== Academics ==
ECU serves around 4,000 students and is perhaps best known for its Environmental Health Science Program, one of only 30 programs nationally accredited by the National Environmental Health Science and Protection Accreditation Council.

A full-size tiger statue in the center of Frank R. Crabtree Sr. Honor Plaza, directly in front of the old Science Hall

East Central is divided into 5 academic units (three colleges and two schools) with 70 degree programs. They are:

- College of Education and Psychology
- College of Health and Sciences
  - School of Nursing
- College of Liberal Arts and Social Sciences
  - School of Fine Arts
- The Harland C. Stonecipher School of Business
- School of Graduate Studies

== Other campuses ==
East Central is no longer one of four participating institutions offering courses at the Ardmore Higher Education Center. There are Distance Education sites located in Shawnee, OK, through the Gordon Cooper Technology Center and McAlester, OK through the Eastern Oklahoma State College.

== Student life ==
Undergraduate demographics as of Fall 2023
Race and ethnicity	Total
White	51%
American Indian/Alaska Native	19%
Black	9%
Hispanic	8%
Asian	6%
Unknown	5%
Two or more races	2%
International student	1%
Economic diversity
Low-income (Note: The percentage of students who received an income-based federal Pell grant intended for low-income students.)	43%
Affluent (Note: The percentage of students who are a part of the American middle class at the bare minimum.)	57%

East Central hosts nearly eighty student organizations. Among them are fraternities and sororities.

== Athletics ==
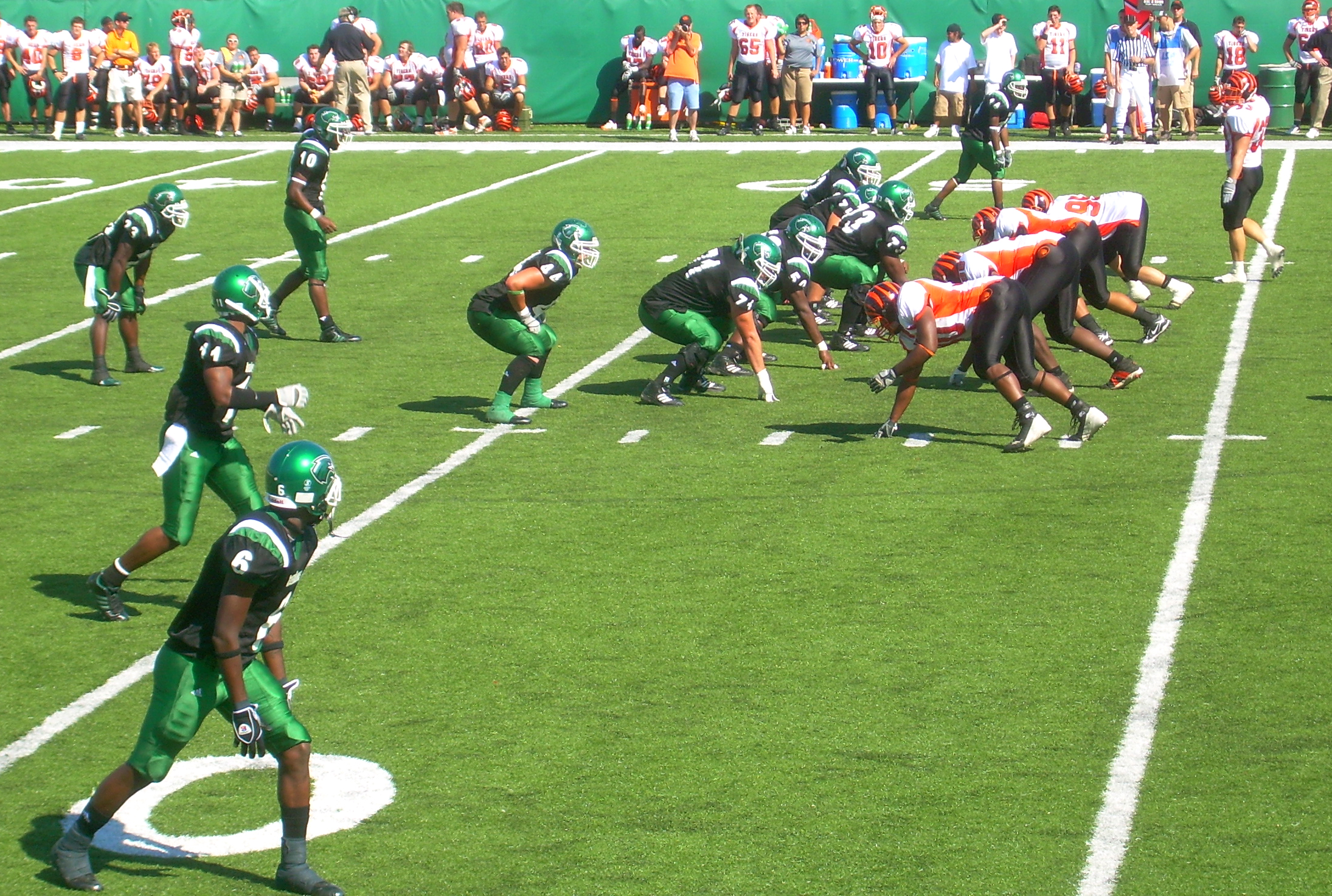
Division II game between East Central and NSU.

East Central's athletic teams (the "Tigers") have competed in the NCAA Division II Great American Conference (GAC) since 2011, after competing in the Lone Star Conference of the NCAA from 1997 to 2011. The university hosts 13 sports, 6 men's athletic programs and 7 programs for women. The school's football team won the NAIA national football championship in 1993. Athletics offices are located within the Kerr Activities Center.

== Notable alumni ==
=== Politics ===
ECU has had several graduates move to political office, including five of alumni who were elected to the position of governor.

- Bill Anoatubby, Chickasaw Nation Governor

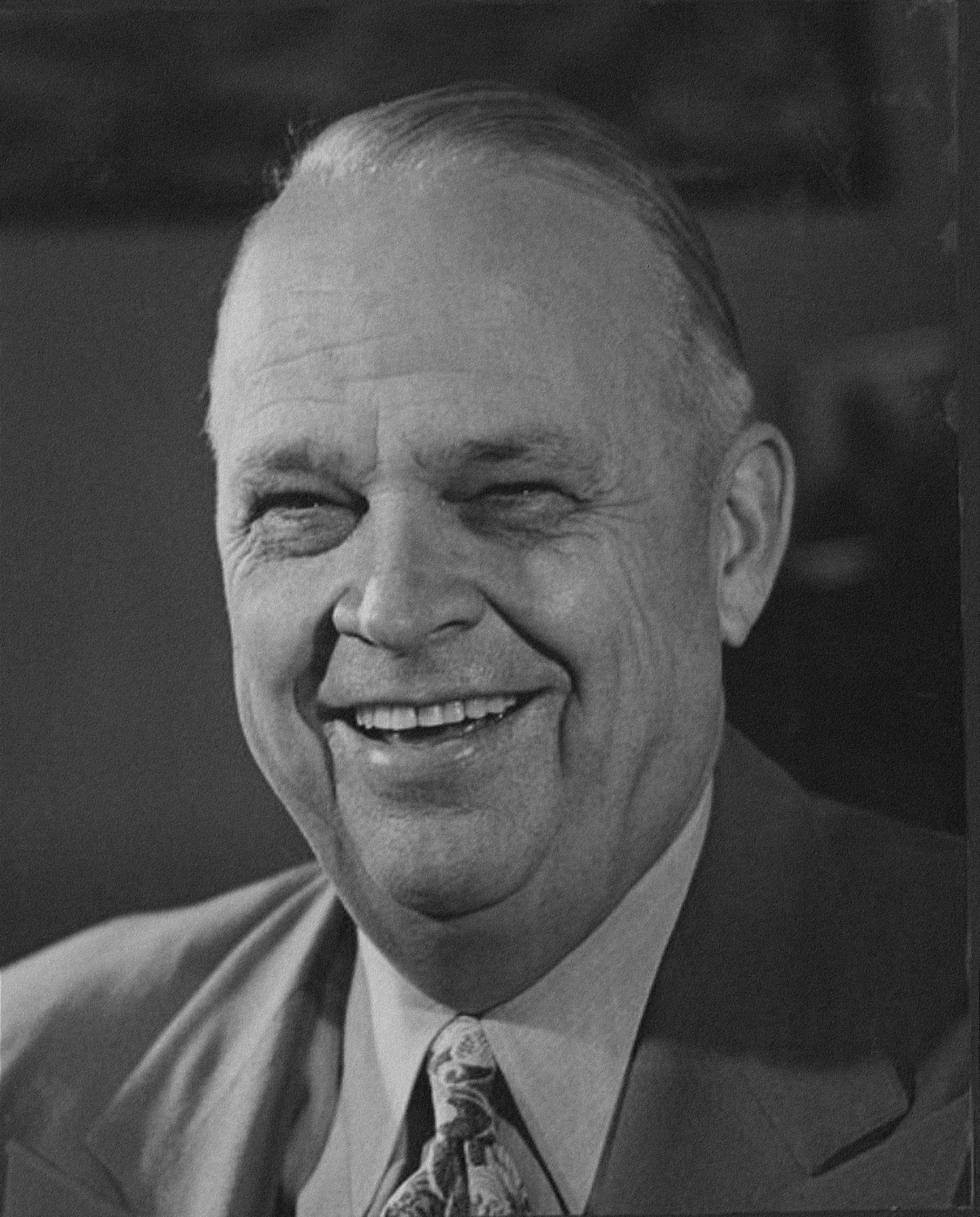
Robert S. Kerr

- Charles W. Blackwell (Class of 1964), first Ambassador of the Chickasaw Nation to the United States from 1995 until 2013.
- Lyle Boren, former U.S. Congressman
- Cindy Byrd, Oklahoma State Auditor and Inspector
- Rudolph Hargrave, Former Chief Justice of the Oklahoma Supreme Court
- Frank W. Davis (Oklahoma politician) (Class of 1958), late member of the Oklahoma House of Representatives
- Robert S. Kerr, former Governor of the State of Oklahoma, and U.S. Senator
- Ernest McFarland, former Arizona Governor
- George Nigh, former Governor of the State of Oklahoma
- Dustin Rowe, current Justice of the Oklahoma Supreme Court

=== Professional sports ===
Several ECU grads have excelled in the area of professional sports:

- Harry Brecheen, baseball player
- Armonty Bryant, football player
- Brad Calip, football player
- Mark Gastineau, football player
- Todd Graham, football coach
- Dewey McClain, football player
- David Moore, football player
- Trinity Benson, football player
- Caleb Holley, football player receiver
- Gil Morgan, golfer
- Jerry Walker, baseball player
- Lloyd Waner, baseball player
- Paul Waner, baseball player

=== Other notable alumni ===
- Wade Burleson, author, historian, and teacher
- Hallie Brown Ford, philanthropist
- Aaron Gwyn, professor
- Lillard Hill, broadcast journalist
- Kenneth Hite, game designer
- Jennifer McLoud-Mann, mathematician
- Leon Polk Smith, Artist
- Harland Stonecipher, Pre-Paid Legal Services, Inc. Founder, Chairman & CEO
- B. Kevin Turner, Former COO of Microsoft, CEO of Sam's Club and CIO of Walmart
- La Vern E. Weber, United States Army Lieutenant General and Chief of the National Guard Bureau
