= KTRX =

Radio station in Dickson, Oklahoma

Coordinates: 34.116°N 97.002°W

- Dickson, Oklahoma; United States
- Broadcast area: Lake Texoma region
- Frequency: 92.7 MHz
- Branding: Star 92.7

Programming
- Format: Top 40

Ownership
- Owner: Stephens Media Group; (SMG-Ardmore, LLC)

History
- First air date: June 2001
- Call sign meaning: "Texoma Rocks" (previous format)

Technical information
- Licensing authority: FCC
- Facility ID: 88041
- Class: A
- ERP: 5,500 watts
- HAAT: 104 meters (341 ft)

Links
- Public license information: Public file; LMS
- Webcast: Listen live
- Website: star927fm.com

KTRX (92.7 FM) is a radio station in Dickson, Oklahoma, serving the Lake Texoma region with a Top 40 format. The station is owned by Stephens Media Group.

== History ==
The station signed on in June 2001 with a classic rock format. By May 17, 2022, KTRX had evolved to an active rock format; at 12 p.m. that day, the station began stunting with song excerpts featuring the word "star" ahead of an announcement to be made at 6 a.m. on May 18. At that time, the station flipped to an adult top 40 format as "Star 92.7", with the first song being "Counting Stars" by OneRepublic.
