= KFOO =

KFOO may refer to:

- KFOO (AM), a radio station (1440 AM) licensed to serve Riverside, California, United States
- KFOO-FM, a radio station (96.1 FM) licensed to serve Opportunity, Washington, United States
- KZTM, a radio station (102.9 FM) licensed to serve McKenna, Washington, United States, which held the call sign KFOO from 2016 to 2017
