= KZFS =

Classic hip hop music radio station in Spokane, Washington

Spokane, Washington; United States
- Broadcast area: Spokane metropolitan area
- Frequency: 1280 kHz
- Branding: Hooptown 101.5

Programming
- Format: Classic hip hop
- Affiliations: Premiere Networks

Ownership
- Owner: iHeartMedia, Inc.; (iHM Licenses, LLC)
- Sister stations: KCDA, KFOO-FM, KISC, KKZX, KQNT

History
- First air date: 1965
- Former call signs: KUDY (1964–2002); KAQQ (2002–2005); KPTQ (2005–2013)
- Call sign meaning: Fox Sports (previous affiliation)

Technical information
- Licensing authority: FCC
- Facility ID: 53149
- Class: D
- Power: 5,000 watts day 125 watts night 250 watts (FM translator)
- Transmitter coordinates: 47°36′27″N 117°21′40″W
- Translator: 101.5 K268DL (Spokane)

Links
- Public license information: Public file; LMS
- Webcast: Listen live (via iHeartRadio)
- Website: hooptown1015.iheart.com

KZFS (1280 kHz, "Hooptown 101.5") is a commercial radio station in Spokane, Washington. It broadcasts a classic hip hop radio format and is owned by iHeartMedia, Inc. Its branding originates from its 250 watt FM translator K268DL at 101.5 MHz.

By day, KZFS's AM signal is powered at 5,000 watts. But to protect other stations on 1280 AM, it reduces power at night to only 125 watts. It uses a directional antenna at all times. The transmitter is on South Palouse Highway in Southeast Spokane.

== History ==
The station was first signed on in 1965. It used KUDY as its call sign and it broadcast a Christian talk and teaching format until 2002. That year, the station swapped signals with KQNT (590 AM); the 1280 AM frequency took on the latter's adult standards format as KAQQ.

In 2005, the station changed its call sign to KPTQ and flipped to a progressive talk format. KPTQ served as the Spokane affiliate of Air America Radio until Air America went off the air in January 2010. On March 26, 2012, the station switched to classic country after sister KIXZ switched to Top 40.

On April 11, 2013, KPTQ flipped to sports talk as a network affiliate of Fox Sports Radio, changing its call letters to KZFS. On April 10, 2015, KZFS adopted a contemporary Christian music format, branded "Up 99.3" (relayed on translator K257FX, 99.3 FM). In March 2018, KZFS flipped to country as "Kix 99.3", inheriting the format and branding of KIIX-FM (which switched to modern rock on March 5). The previous Christian format was moved to KISC-HD2 and rebranded as "UP! 98.1 HD2".

Logo for KZFS as "Kix 99.3" from March 2018 to March 2020.

In March 2020, KZFS flipped to Classic hip hop, branded as "Hooptown 101.5", and began simulcasting on translator K268DL (101.5 FM). Subsequently, the simulcast of the country format (which remains on K257FX) was moved to KISC's HD2 subchannel. The Hooptown branding is derived from Spokane's unofficial nickname of "Hooptown USA", referring to the success of the city's college and high school basketball teams.
