= KPXR =

KPXR may refer to:

- KPXR-TV, a television station (channel 22, virtual 48) licensed to Cedar Rapids, Iowa, United States
- KFOO-FM, a radio station (96.1 FM) licensed to Opportunity, Washington, United States, which used the call sign KPXR-FM from 2013 to 2014
