= KQNT =

- Spokane, Washington (Note: Originally licensed to Seattle; moved to Spokane in 1925.); United States
- Broadcast area: Spokane metropolitan area
- Frequency: 590 kHz
- Branding: Newsradio 590 KQNT

Programming
- Format: News/talk
- Affiliations: Premiere Networks; Fox News Radio; Compass Media Networks

Ownership
- Owner: iHeartMedia, Inc.; (iHM Licenses, LLC)
- Sister stations: KCDA, KFOO-FM, KISC, KKZX, KZFS

History
- First air date: February 28, 1922
- Former call signs: KHQ (1922–1985); KLSN (1985–1986); KAQQ (1986–2002)
- Call sign meaning: KHQ News Talk

Technical information
- Licensing authority: FCC
- Facility ID: 60421
- Class: B
- Power: 5,000 watts unlimited
- Transmitter coordinates: 47°36′54.6″N 117°15′0.7″W
- Repeater: 98.9 KKZX-HD2 (Spokane)

Links
- Public license information: Public file; LMS
- Webcast: Listen live (via iHeartRadio)
- Website: 590kqnt.iheart.com

KQNT (590 kHz) is a commercial radio station licensed to Spokane, Washington. It is one of the oldest radio stations in Washington, going on the air in 1922 in Seattle. KQNT offers a news/talk format and is owned by iHeartMedia, Inc. The studios and offices are on East Sprague Street in Spokane.

KQNT is powered at 5,000 watts, using a non-directional antenna. The transmitter is on East Sands Road in Spokane Valley, Washington.

== Programming ==
All of KQNT's weekday shows are from nationally syndicated hosts: Glenn Beck, Clay Travis & Buck Sexton, Sean Hannity, Joe Pags, Jesse Kelly, Clyde Lewis, Coast to Coast AM with George Noory and This Morning, America's First News with Gordon Deal.

Weekends feature shows on money, health, home improvement, real estate and law. Weekend syndicated shows include At Home with Gary Sullivan, Bill Handel on the Law and Sunday Night Live with Bill Cunningham as well as repeats of weekday shows. Most hours begin with world and national news from Fox News Radio.

== History ==
=== KHQ in Seattle ===
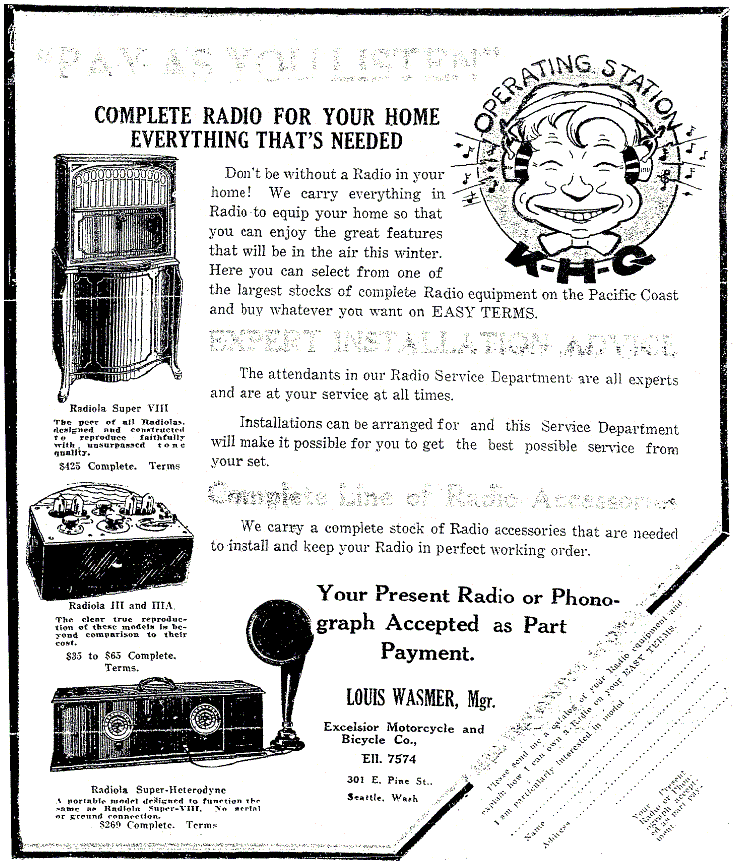
1924 advertisement for the Excelsior Motorcycle and Bicycle Co., "Operating Station KHQ".

KQNT's first license, with the randomly assigned call letters KHQ, was issued to Louis Wasmer in Seattle on February 28, 1922. KHQ broadcast on the 360 meter (833 kHz) "entertainment" wavelength. Wasmer was a former United Wireless Telegraph Company radiotelegraph operator, who had opened the Excelsior Motorcycle and Bicycle Co. in 1911, and also sold radio equipment. Following two weeks of transmitter adjustment, the station made its debut broadcast on February 28, 1922. Its initial schedule was phonograph music presented every evening between 7 and 8:30.

KHQ was the second Seattle station licensed following the formal establishment of a broadcasting service category on December 1, 1921, by the U.S. Department of Commerce, the regulators of radio at this time. The first Seattle station licensed under these new regulations was KFC on December 8, 1921, which was operated jointly by the Northern Radio and Electric Company and the Post-Intelligencer newspaper. A third Seattle station, Vincent I. Kraft's KJR received its broadcasting station license on March 9, 1922. However Kraft had begun broadcasting over an experimental station beginning in 1920. Thus, when KHQ debuted it was described by a local newspaper as "the third broadcaster".

In March, KHQ suspended operations for nearly two weeks, returning with a 50-watt transmitter that replaced the original 10-watt set, which had been sold to the Economy Market so it could establish station KZC.

Because initially there was only the single entertainment wavelength of 360 meters available for use by multiple stations, regions had to set up a timesharing agreement to allocate individual station timeslots. On November 28, 1922, KHQ had the fewest programs of four listed stations, with a schedule of 7:00 to 8:00 p.m. on Tuesdays, Wednesdays and Saturdays.

In January 1925, KHQ began broadcasting from a studio located at the Bush & Lane Piano Company store on Third Avenue, and the station also moved to 1100 kHz.

=== KHQ in Spokane ===
In May 1925 it was announced that KHQ was temporarily going off the air in order to give Bush & Lane time to "make extensive alterations in the studio", in addition to a major facility upgrade. Instead, after broadcasting for three years in Seattle, Wasmer relocated the station to Spokane, reportedly transporting the radio equipment in a motorcycle sidecar. KHQ was Spokane's fifth radio station, preceded by stations KFZ, KOE, KFIO (now KSBN) and KFPY (now KXLY), although only KFIO and KFPY were still licensed at the time of KHQ's arrival.

Part of the move included an upgrade from 100 to 1,000 watts, although the station remained on 1100 kHz. KHQ's Spokane debut on October 30, 1925, from the Davenport Hotel, was made with great fanfare. Announcer Frank "Spark Plug" Buhlert told listeners that "The first 500 persons who send telegrams or phone in that they have heard the program will receive a souvenir bag of ore from the world's largest lead mine, the Bunker Hill & Sullivan, at Kellogg, Idaho." The debut broadcast ran from 8 p.m. to midnight, and included assorted speeches and music.

Wasmer moved the station's studios and office across Post Street from the Davenport Hotel to the seventh floor of Spokane Stock Exchange Building (also called the Eilers Building) in 1928 because the fledgling station had outgrown its quarters in the hotel. KGA later joined KHQ in the building, which was subsequently renamed the Radio Central Building.

KHQ changed its transmitting frequency a number of times in the mid-twenties, until November 11, 1928, when, under the provisions of a major reallocation resulting from the Federal Radio Commission's (FRC) General Order 40, it was reassigned to 590 kHz which it and its successors have used ever since.

The August 1941 adoption of the Federal Communications Commission's "duopoly" rule restricted licensees from operating more than one radio station in a given market. At this time Louis Wasmer, Inc. owned two Spokane stations: KHQ and KGA. To conform with the FCC order, in 1946 Wasmer sold KHQ to the Cowles Publishing Company, publisher of The Spokesman-Review newspaper, which used it to a television station in 1952 (which still bears the KHQ-TV calls, and is an affiliate of the NBC television network), and an FM station (now KISC) in 1962. KHQ stayed in the Radio Central Building until 1960, when it moved to a modern facility next to its transmitter site on South Regal on the Moran Prairie.

=== KLSN ===
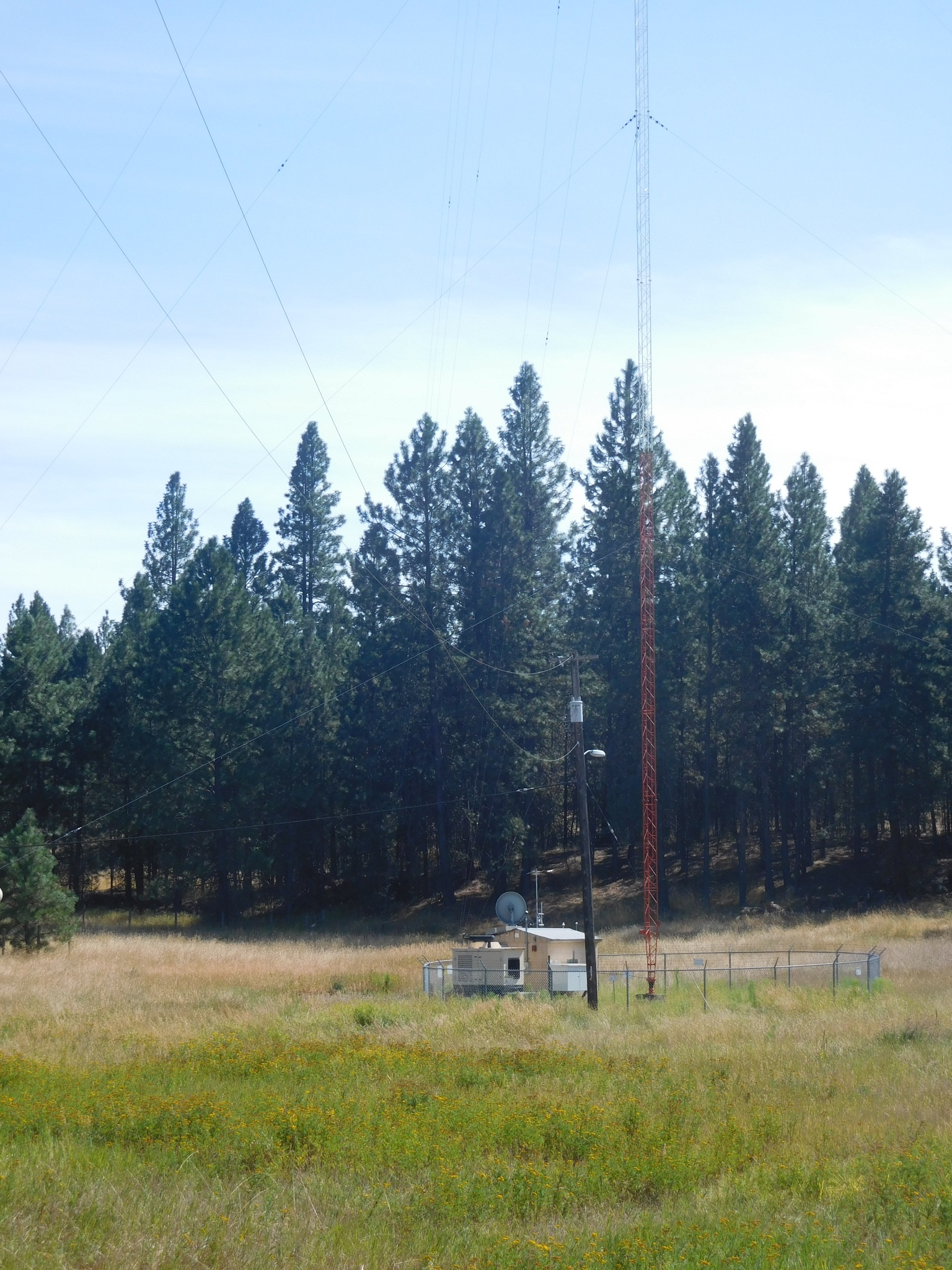
KQNT radio tower, Spokane Valley

Cowles sold off its radio interests in 1984, and kept the historic KHQ call letters for its TV station. Because of an FCC rule in place at the time that prohibited TV and radio stations in the same market but with different ownership from sharing the same call letters, AM 590 changed its call to KLSN on January 1, 1985, with the slogan "Listen 5-90".

=== KAQQ ===
On December 1, 1986, the station changed its call sign to KAQQ, which was phonetically similar to the original KHQ call letters.

=== KQNT ===
On January 1, 2002, the call sign became KQNT.

== See also ==
- List of initial AM-band station grants in the United States
