= Sports in Spokane, Washington =

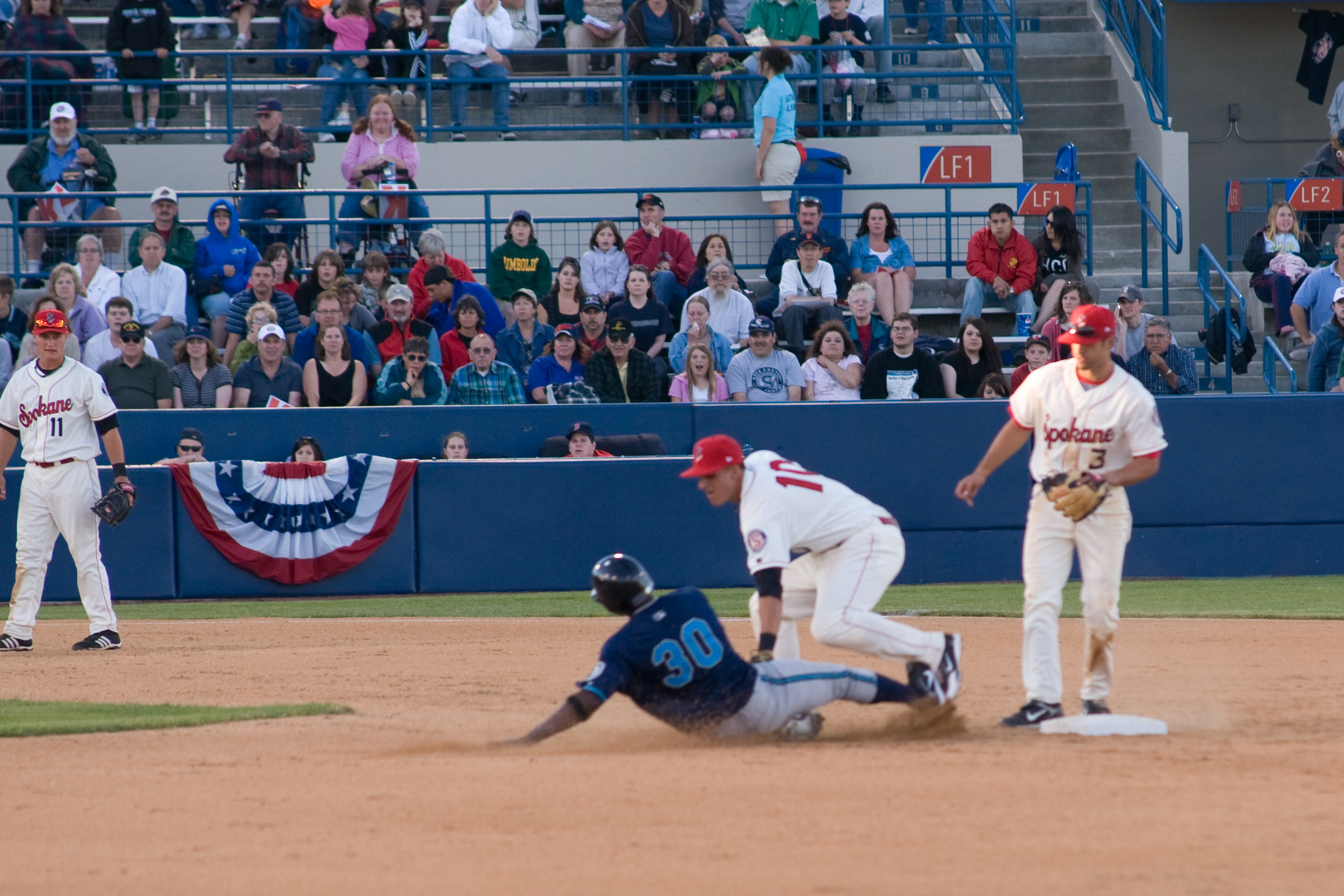
An Indians game at Avista Stadium

Spokane, Washington has a rich sporting culture and the area residents are active in many spectator and participant sports. Although Spokane lacks any major, nationally recognized professional sports team, Spokane has a sports friendly atmosphere, and was recognized and rated #99 in the Sporting News 2006 "99 Best Sporting Cities" list. In 2009, Sports Business Journal rated Spokane as the fifth best minor league sports market in America out of 239 markets.

Spectators may attend sporting events around the Spokane area, including professional and collegiate sporting events. Participants enjoy activities from running the annual Lilac Bloomsday Run and playing in the annual Hoopfest. Spokane is associated as being home to some sports teams that have gained recognition in their respective arenas. Spokane's notable sports teams include the Spokane Zephyr FC (USL Super League), Spokane Velocity FC (USL League One), Spokane Chiefs (Western Hockey League), the Spokane Indians (Northwest League) who play their home games in nearby Spokane Valley, and the Spokane Shadow (Evergreen Premier League).

== Current professional or semi-professional teams ==
Club	Sport	League	Stadium (or Arena)
Spokane Indians	Baseball	Northwest League (Eastern Division)	Avista Stadium
Lilac City Legends	Basketball	United States Basketball League	Numerica Veterans Arena
Spokane Chiefs	Ice hockey	Western Hockey League (U.S. Division)	Numerica Veterans Arena
Spokane Velocity FC	Soccer	USL League One	ONE Spokane Stadium
Spokane Zephyr FC	Soccer	USL Super League	ONE Spokane Stadium
Spokane Shadow	Soccer	Evergreen Premier League; National Premier Soccer League	Spokane Falls Community College Stadium
Spokane SC Shadow	Soccer	Women's Premier Soccer League	Spokane Falls Community College Stadium

The Spokane Chiefs are a junior ice hockey team that play in the Canadian Hockey League's Western Hockey League. They play their home games in the Spokane Arena and have a regional rivalry with the Tri-City Americans. They have won the CHL's top prize, the Memorial Cup, two times in club history, first in 1991 and again in 2008.

Spokane's involvement in minor league baseball dates back to 1892 when it fielded a team in the Pacific Northwest League, the Spokane Bunchgrassers, and the Indians nickname dates to 1903. The Spokane Indians have their home ground in the suburb of Spokane Valley, and are a High Single-A baseball team in the Northwest League (NWL) and have been a farm team of the Colorado Rockies since 2021. The Indians play their home games at the 6,803-seat Avista Stadium and have won seven NWL titles since their Short-Season-A debut in 1982. Prior to 1982, the Indians played at the Triple-A level. The team achieved considerable success in the early 1970s, winning the Pacific Coast League championship in 1970, and having a 94–52 record. In the 1920s and 1930s the Spokane City League, a semiprofessional baseball league of teams of the Inland Empire, reached its peak.

Spokane Zephyr FC is an American professional women's soccer club based in Spokane, Washington, that competes in the USL Super League (USLS). Zephyr FC is owned by Aequus Sports, which also operates Spokane Velocity FC of USL League One (USL1).

Spokane Velocity FC is an American professional soccer club based in Spokane, Washington. The Velocity compete in USL League One, the third tier of the U.S. soccer pyramid, and play home matches at One Spokane Stadium. The team was founded in 2022 and began play in the 2024 season, where they finished as runners-up in the playoffs. The Velocity shares its ownership and stadium with Spokane Zephyr FC, a women's team in the first-division USL Super League.

The club's current head coach is Leigh Veidman.

=== Defunct teams ===
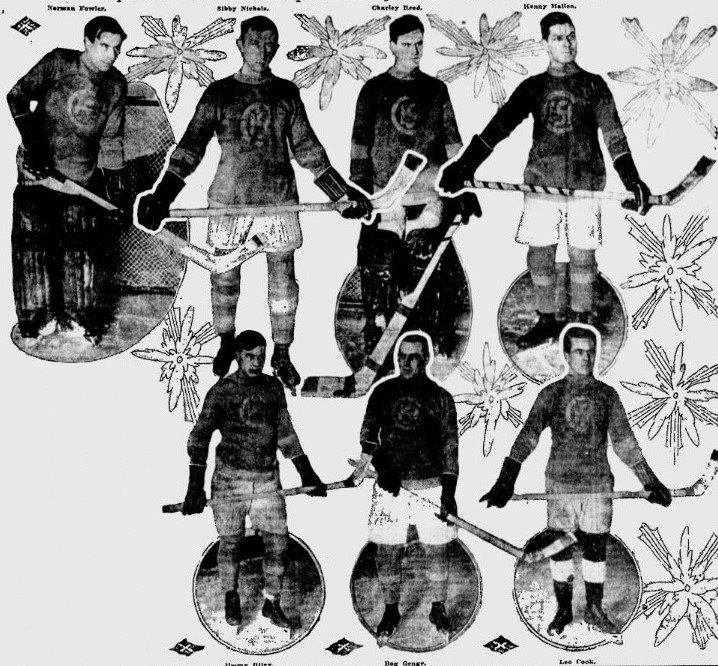
The 1916–17 Spokane Canaries of the PCHA was the only major league professional franchise to represent Spokane

- Spokane Bunchgrassers (1890-1892), a minor league baseball team in the Pacific Northwest League which won the first Pacific Northwest League Championship.
- Spokane Canaries (1916), a major league professional hockey team officially called the Spokane Hockey Club, and formerly the Victoria Aristocrats, was a relocated team from Victoria, British Columbia that competed in the Pacific Coast Hockey Association for only the 1916–17 season. They were nicknamed the "Canaries" by a local boy after seeing their yellow and purple uniforms. The team was Spokane's first and only major league professional sports franchise and it was folded after only one season due to poor game attendance. The team was reactivated as the Aristocrats in Victoria two years later.
- Spokane Flyers (senior) (1948-1980), a senior amateur ice hockey team in the Western International Hockey League who were the 1949-50 National Senior Champions.
- Spokane Flyers (junior) (1980-1982), a junior ice hockey team that competed for one and a half seasons in the Western Hockey League.
- Spokane Comets (1958-1963), were a minor league ice hockey team in the Western Hockey League .
- Spokane Jets (1963-1974), was a minor league hockey team that was created to compete in the Western International Hockey League after the purchase and relocation of the Spokane Flyers in 1963; they would be renamed the Flyers in 1974 and were the first United States-based team to win the Allan Cup.
- Spokane Spiders (2006-2010), was a soccer team that played in the USL Premier Development League in the Northwest Division of the Western Conference.
- Spokane Black Widows (2010) was a soccer team that played in the Women's Premier Soccer League for one season.
- Spokane Shine (2010-?), was a soccer team that played in the Women's Premier Soccer League; they won the 2012 Northwest Division regular-season title.
- Spokane Shock (2006-2017, 2020-2021), an indoor football team that competed first in the AF2 and Arena Football League and then the Indoor Football League. The Shock were AFL champions in their inaugural season, winning in ArenaBowl XXIII.

== College sports ==
Collegiate sports in the area focus on the Gonzaga Bulldogs who compete in the NCAA's Division I West Coast Conference and Eastern Washington Eagles who play in the Big Sky Conference and the Whitworth Pirates who play in the Division III Northwest Conference. Gonzaga sponsors baseball, basketball, cross Country, golf, rowing, soccer, tennis, and indoor and outdoor track and field for men and basketball, cross country, golf, rowing, soccer, tennis, indoor and outdoor track and field, and volleyball for women.

=== Gonzaga Basketball ===
In sports media, Spokane is arguably most notable for being the home of the Gonzaga Bulldogs and their NCAA Division I men's basketball program that competes in the West Coast Conference (WCC) through the 2025–26 season, after which Gonzaga will join the Pac-12 Conference. Although the WCC is often considered a "mid-major" conference, the Gonzaga basketball program is often considered a major program. Gonzaga regularly makes it to the NCAA Division I men's basketball tournament which includes an appearance and runner-up finish in the 2017 and 2021 championship games. They have made it to the tournament every time since Gonzaga's rise to national prominence in their Cinderella run to the Elite 8 in the 1999 tournament. Gonzaga has produced many NBA players, including John Stockton, Frank Burgess, Dan Dickau, Richie Frahm, Ronny Turiaf, Austin Daye, Jeremy Pargo, Adam Morrison, Corey Kispert, Rui Hachimura, Chet Holmgren, and Andrew Nembhard. When the college basketball season begins, the Bulldogs regularly sell out their home games in the McCarthey Athletic Center on the Gonzaga University campus, just north of downtown.

== High school and youth sports ==
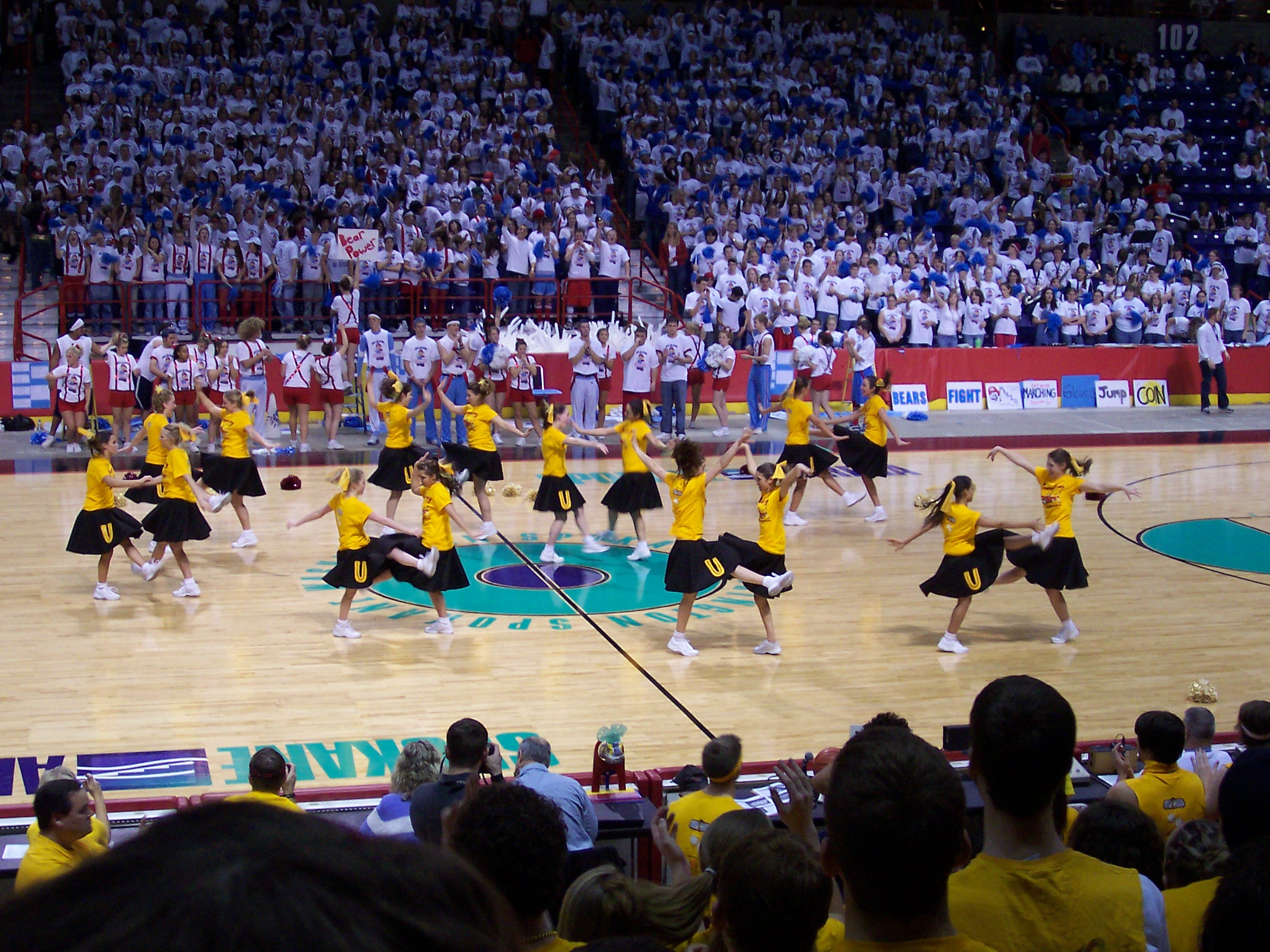
Half Time show of the Stinky Sneaker rivalry game between Central Valley and U-High

High school sports in Spokane focus on the Greater Spokane League (GSL) in District 8 of the Washington Interscholastic Activities Association, where schools in the state compete in a variety of sports across the 4A, 3A, and 2A divisions. The Greater Spokane League was formed in 1925 as the Spokane City League and became the GSL in 1976. All of the Spokane area public schools in the Spokane Public Schools District, Mead School District, and the Spokane Valley school districts as well as Gonzaga Preparatory School and Cheney High School, Pullman High School, and Clarkston High School compete in the GSL in a variety of sports.

== Venues ==
Venues

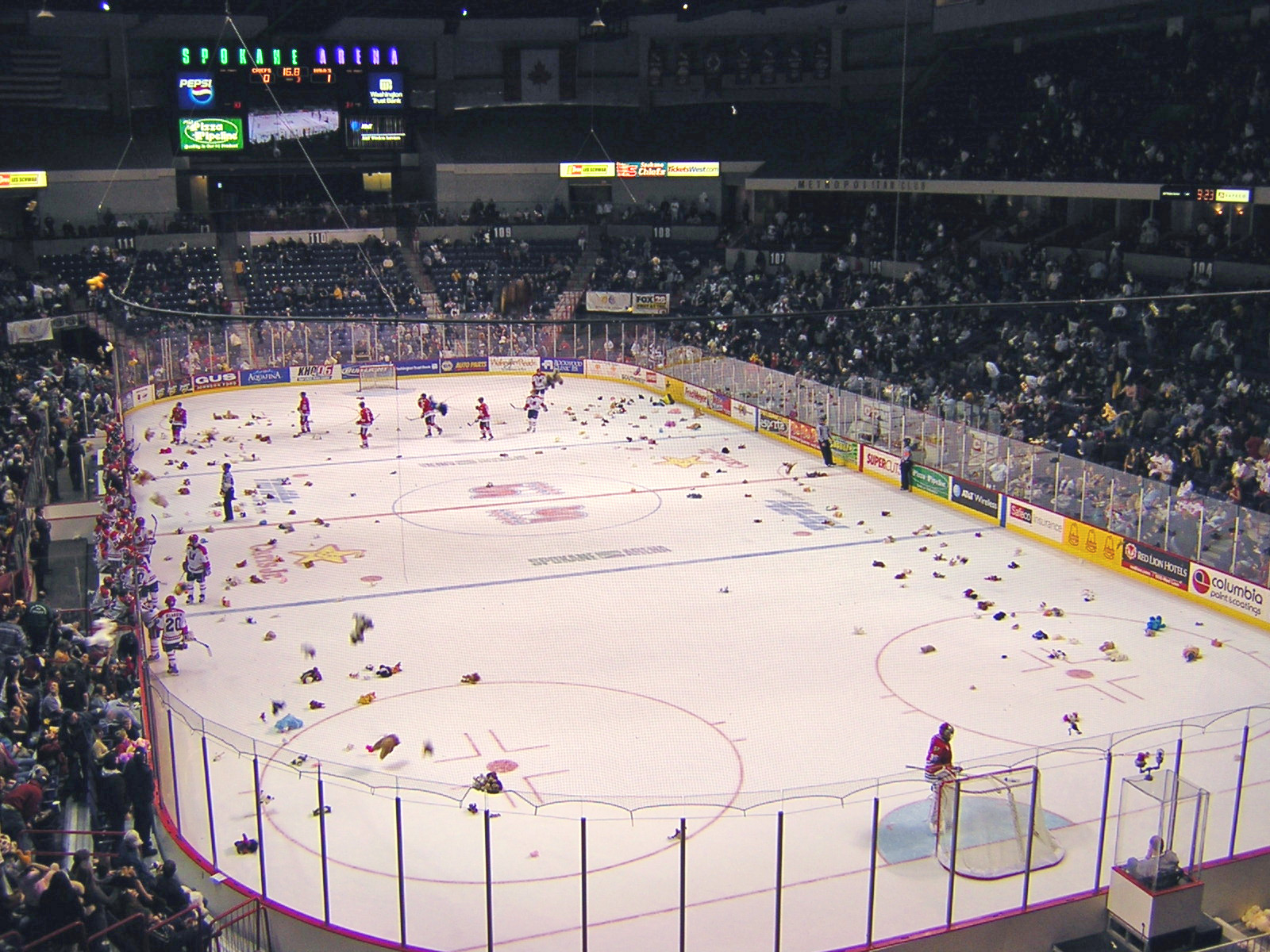
Spokane Arena in hockey configuration

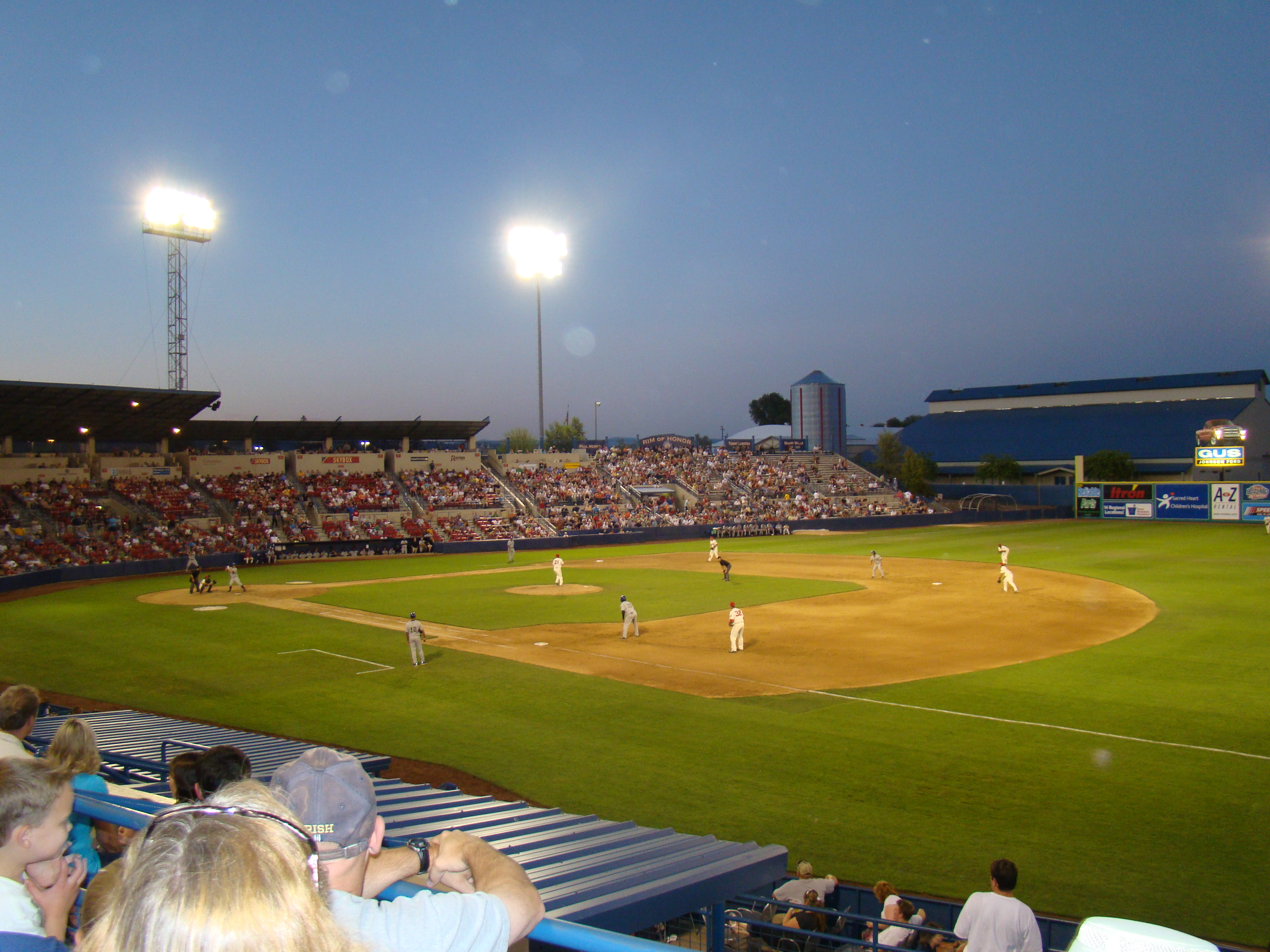
Avista Stadium

Most of Spokane's sports facilities are located on the north bank of the Spokane River. In 1995, the Spokane Public Facilities District opened Spokane's premier sports venue, the Spokane Veterans Memorial Arena, which has a maximum seating capacity of 12,638 and is the home venue for the Spokane Chiefs and the Spokane Shock. Constructed in 2021, The Podium, is a multi-use sportsplex with a seating capacity of 3,000. A new 5,000-seat stadium for Spokane Public Schools athletics is planned for a lot next to The Podium, and is expected to also be the home ground of a USL League One soccer team. The Spokane Indians home venue, Avista Stadium in Spokane Valley, is just outside city limits and has a seating capacity of 6,803.

=== Former facilities ===
- Playfair Race Course (1901-2001), was a horse racing venue that hosted events such as the Playfair Mile, Spokane Derby, and the two-mile (3.2 km) Inland Empire Marathon
- Spokane Coliseum (1954-1995), nicknamed "The Boone Street Barn", was an indoor arena with seating capacity of 5,400
- Joe Albi Stadium (1950-2021), a 28,646-seat stadium in northwest Spokane
- Gonzaga Stadium (1922-1947), was a 2,000-seat stadium that was the home ground of Gonzaga Bulldogs football until 1941 when the university stopped sponsoring the football program due to the financial woes
- Spokane Arena (original) (1916-?), later known as the Elm Street Arena was an open air arena reportedly with a possible capacity of 4,000. It was among the first venues to utilize artificial ice

=== Hosting major events ===
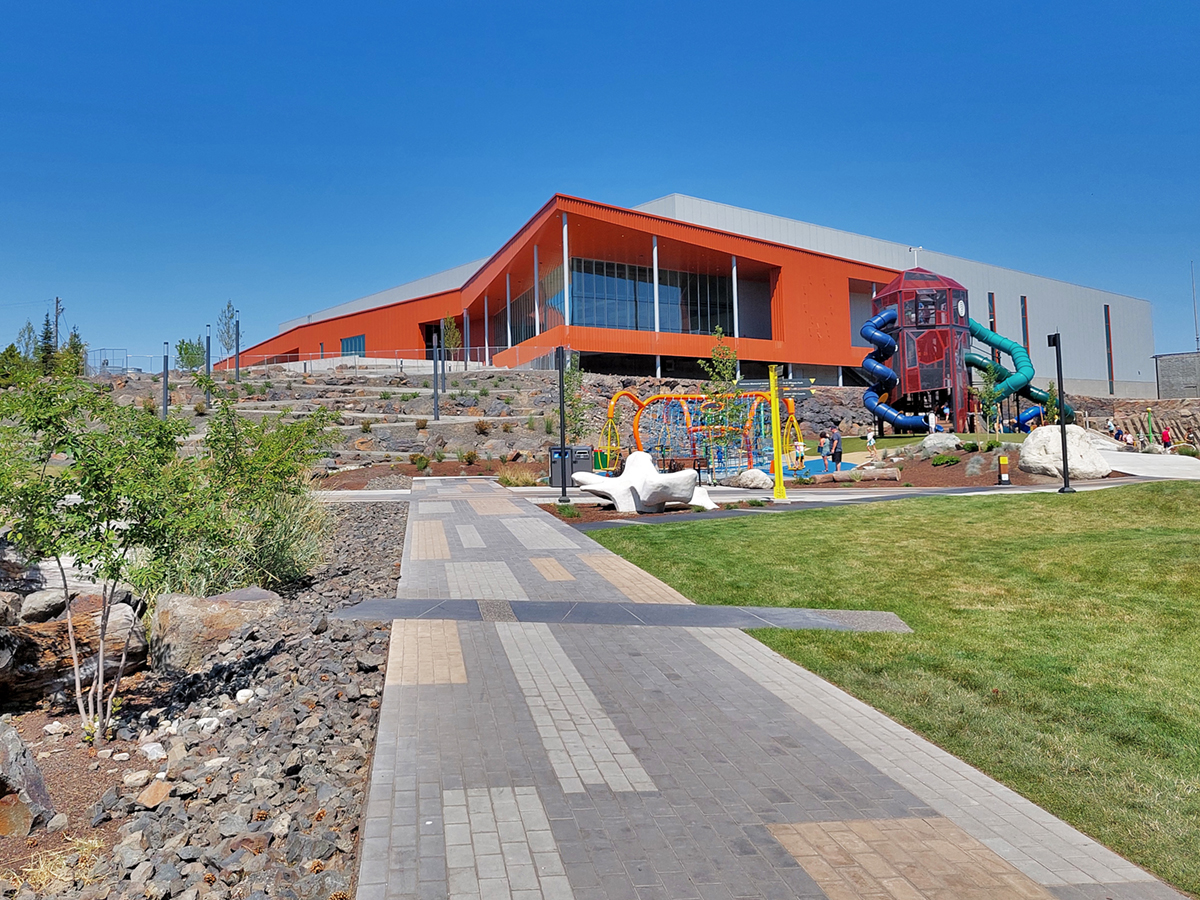
Many sporting events are hosted at The Podium

In 1995, the Spokane Public Facilities District opened Spokane's premier sports venue, the Spokane Veterans Memorial Arena to replace the aging Spokane Coliseum. In the years since the Spokane Arena opened, it along with the city of Spokane have played host to several major sporting events. The first major event the 1998 Memorial Cup, the championship game of the Canadian Hockey League. Four years later in 2002, Spokane hosted the 2002 Skate America figure skating competition, as well as the first two rounds of NCAA Division I Women's Basketball Tournament. In 2003 and 2007 the NCAA returned to Spokane with the Division I Men's Tournament, and again in 2008 with the Women's tournament. The Spokane Arena is the perennial host to the State 'B' Basketball Tournament, which brings athletes and fans from across Washington to Spokane. With the split of the 'B' classification in 2006, beginning in 2007 the city was host to the State 2B (the state's second smallest class) Basketball Championships.

With the addition of The Podium, the city hopes to attract bigger sporting events; the venue has already booked the 2022 National Track Championships.

==== 2007 U.S. Figure Skating Championship ====
The biggest sports event hosted in Spokane history was the 2007 U.S. Figure Skating Championships. The event set an attendance record, selling nearly 155,000 tickets and passing the previous mark of 125,000 set by the 2002 United States Figure Skating Championships in Los Angeles and was later named the Sports Event of the Year by Sports Travel Magazine, beating out notable events, including Super Bowl XLI, among others. Fans, analysts and athletes, including Ice Dancing champion Tanith Belbin, spoke highly of the city's performance as host, which included large, supportive crowds. Spokane was also a candidate city for the 2009 World Figure Skating Championships, losing its bid to Los Angeles. On May 5, 2008, it was announced that Spokane would once again host the U.S. Figure Skating Championships in 2010—ending eighteen days before the start of the 2010 Winter Olympics games in Vancouver, British Columbia.

== Summer sports ==
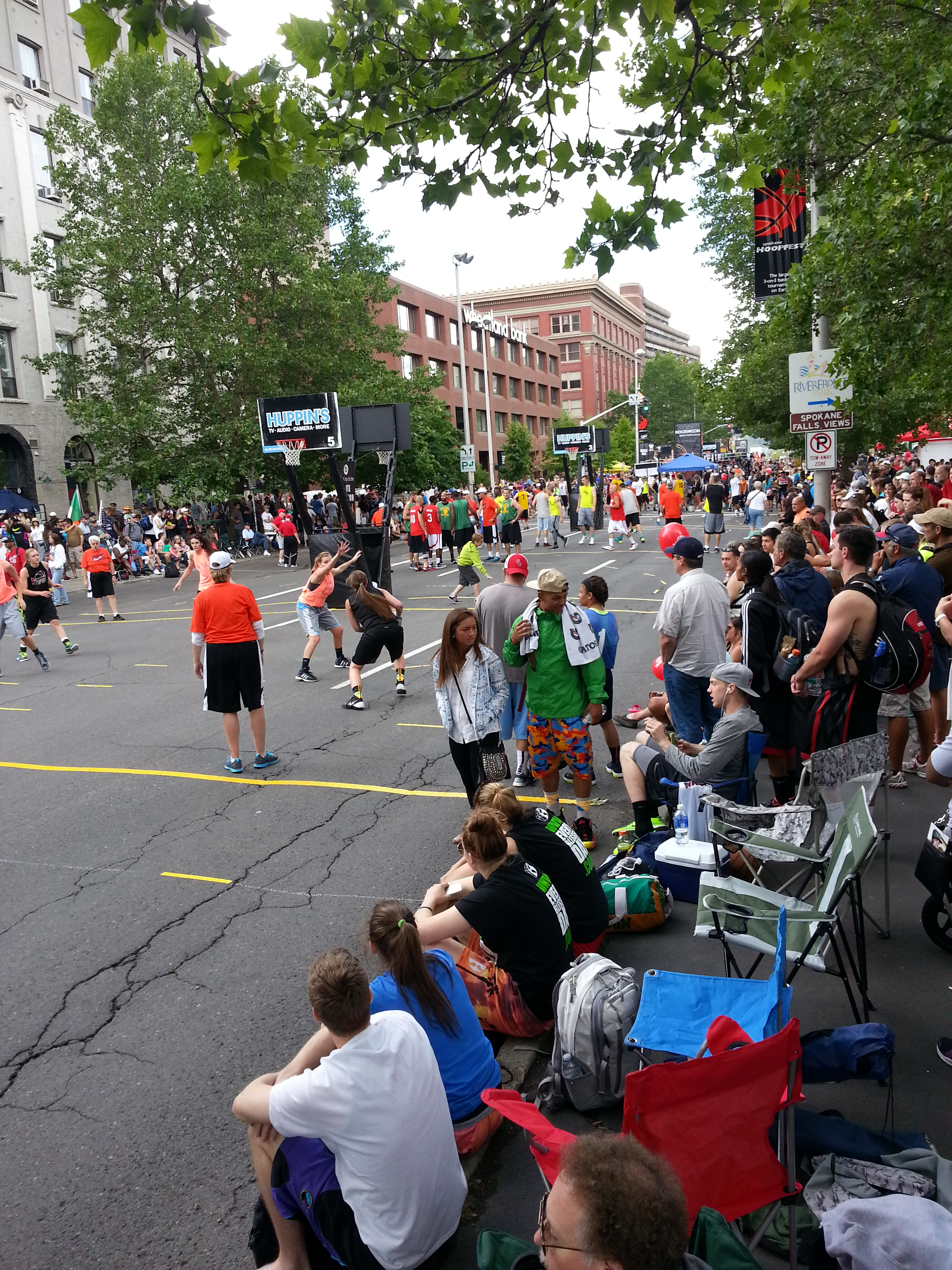
Hoopfest games being played on Spokane Falls Blvd

=== Basketball ===
==== Hoopfest ====
Every June the city hosts Spokane Hoopfest, a 3-on-3 basketball tournament, among the largest of its kind in the world. In 2010, there were 428 courts spread throughout the downtown Spokane streets, resulting in over 40 city blocks being inaccessible to vehicles. A very wide range of players are allowed to play from amateurs to elite athletes, as the only requirement is that players must be entering at least the third grade in the fall following Hoopfest. Many teams highlight their individuality and sense of humor in the selection of their team name and team attire. The event however is not just a basketball event, as there is often live music being played in Riverfront Park, along with merchandisers and various food tents. In 2019, during the Hoopfest organization's 30th anniversary, they launched a community brand, nicknaming Spokane "Hooptown USA". The campaign is supposed to impart the rich basketball culture the community has and their passion for the sport that transcends the game.

=== Running ===
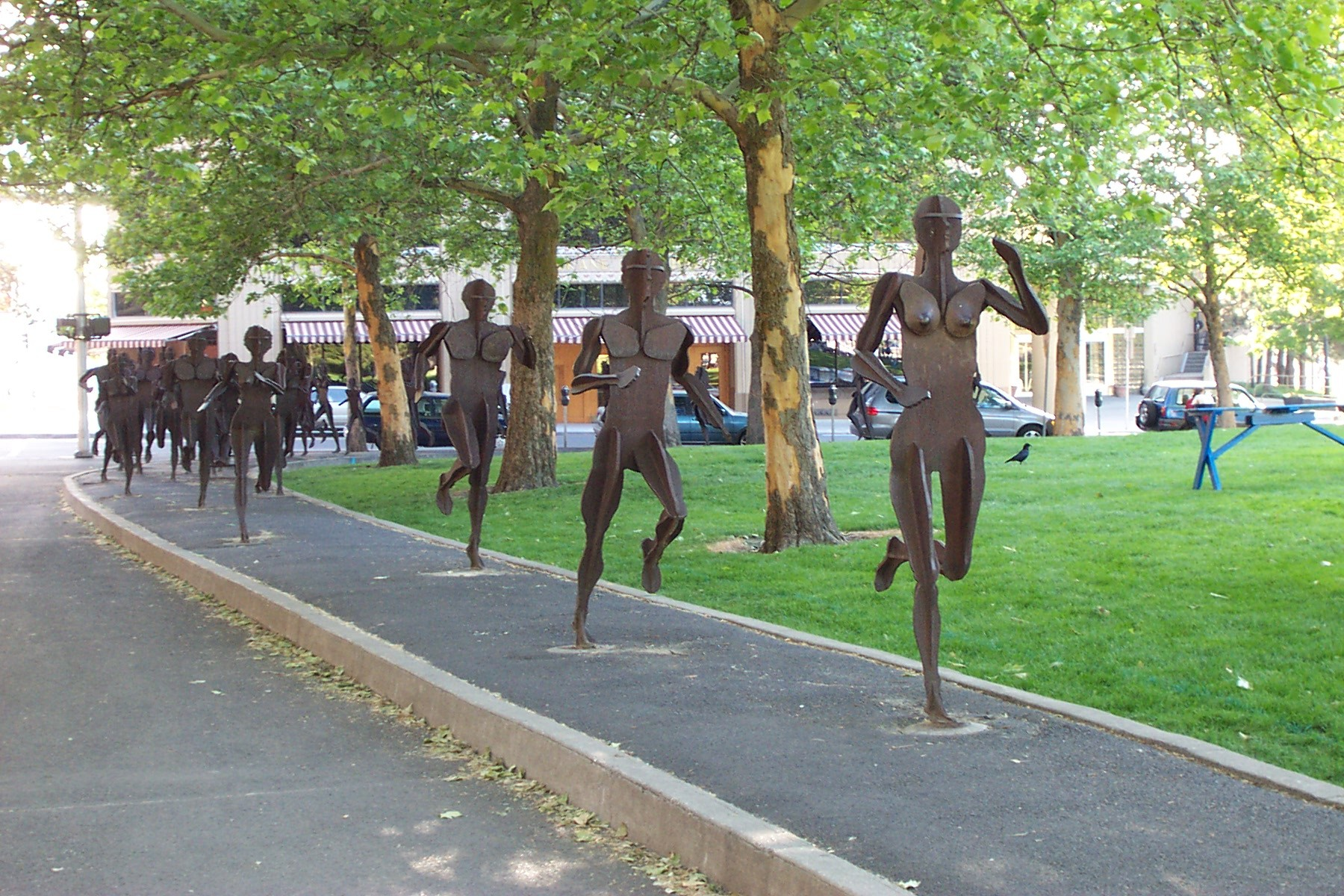
The Joy of Running Together bronzes were gifted to the city in honor of the annual Lilac Bloomsday Run

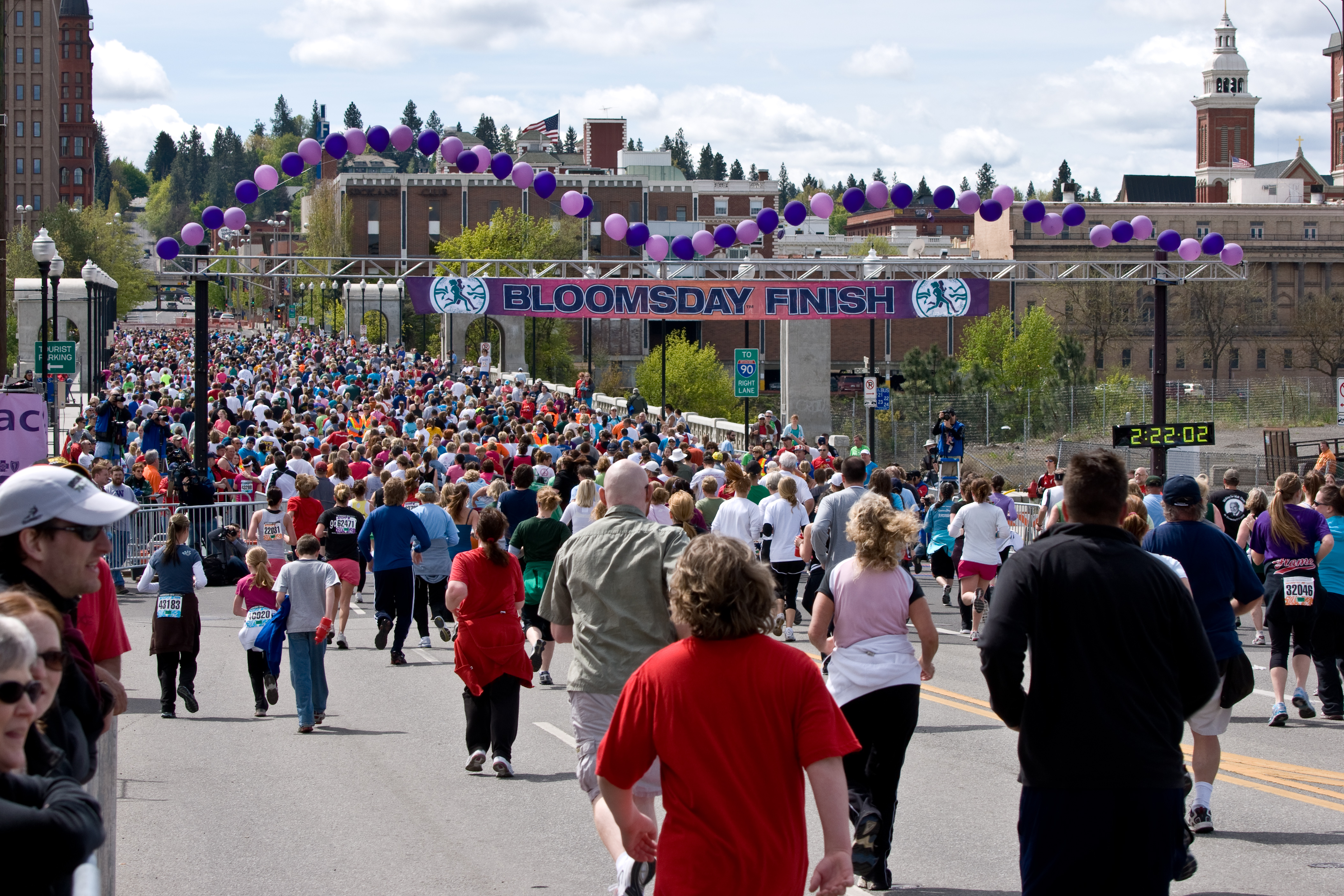
Bloomsday runners or "Bloomies" cross the finish line in 2010

Spokane has a well-established running culture. The city's location, extensive number of parks and trails, community involvement, competitive high school athletics, and long-standing running traditions have contributed to its reputation as a prominent center for distance running in the United States. The area's most widely attended running event is Bloomsday. Another notable regional event is the Coeur d'Alene marathon, which is held annually in late May on the North Idaho Centennial Trail.

==== Bloomsday ====
The Lilac Bloomsday Run, held in the spring on the first Sunday of May, is a 7.46-mile (12.01 km) race for competitive runners as well as walkers that attracts international competition. The first Bloomsday was organized by Don Kardong in 1977 and drew a crowd of 1,200 people. A Junior Bloomsday course of 1.25-mile (2.01 km) is held at the Interstate Fairgrounds. The number of finishers in 2015 was 43,206. Every finisher of the race receives a Bloomsday T-shirt.

=== Cycling ===
There are a variety of trails that are available for cycling in the Spokane area. The area has 14 trails that cover 4,259 miles (6,854 km). Among the most popular of these trails are the Spokane River Centennial Trail/North Idaho Centennial Trail and the Trail of the Coeur d'Alenes. Another rail trail in the region near the terminus of the Trail of the Coeur d'Alenes is the Route of the Hiawatha, which is a 46-mile (74 km) trail that runs through railroad trestles and tunnels between Idaho and Montana.

==== SpokeFest ====
The city has an annual cycling event called SpokeFest. Riders of varying degrees of experience start in the Kendall Yards neighborhood and can choose to do a 9-mile (14 km), 21-mile (34 km), or 50-mile (80 km) "half century" route; The 21-mile route takes cyclists south across the Monroe Street Bridge then west through Browns Addition and north on Government Way and onto the Centennial Trail before reaching Riverside State Park and crossing the 7 Mile Bridge to go back south on Aubrey and L. White Parkway and Pettit Drive to finish at the top of the Spokane Falls whereas the 9-mile route takes a shortcut over the Downriver Bridge before going south and the half century route adds an additional 29-mile loop that travels through Riverside State Park before crossing the 7 Mile Bridge to travel southward back to the start.

==== BMX ====
The Dwight Merkel Sports Complex BMX track was built in 2007 as part of a $43 million park bond and is considered one of the best tracks in the country and hosted the 2017 and 2020 USA BMX Lumberjack Nationals.

=== Triathlon ===
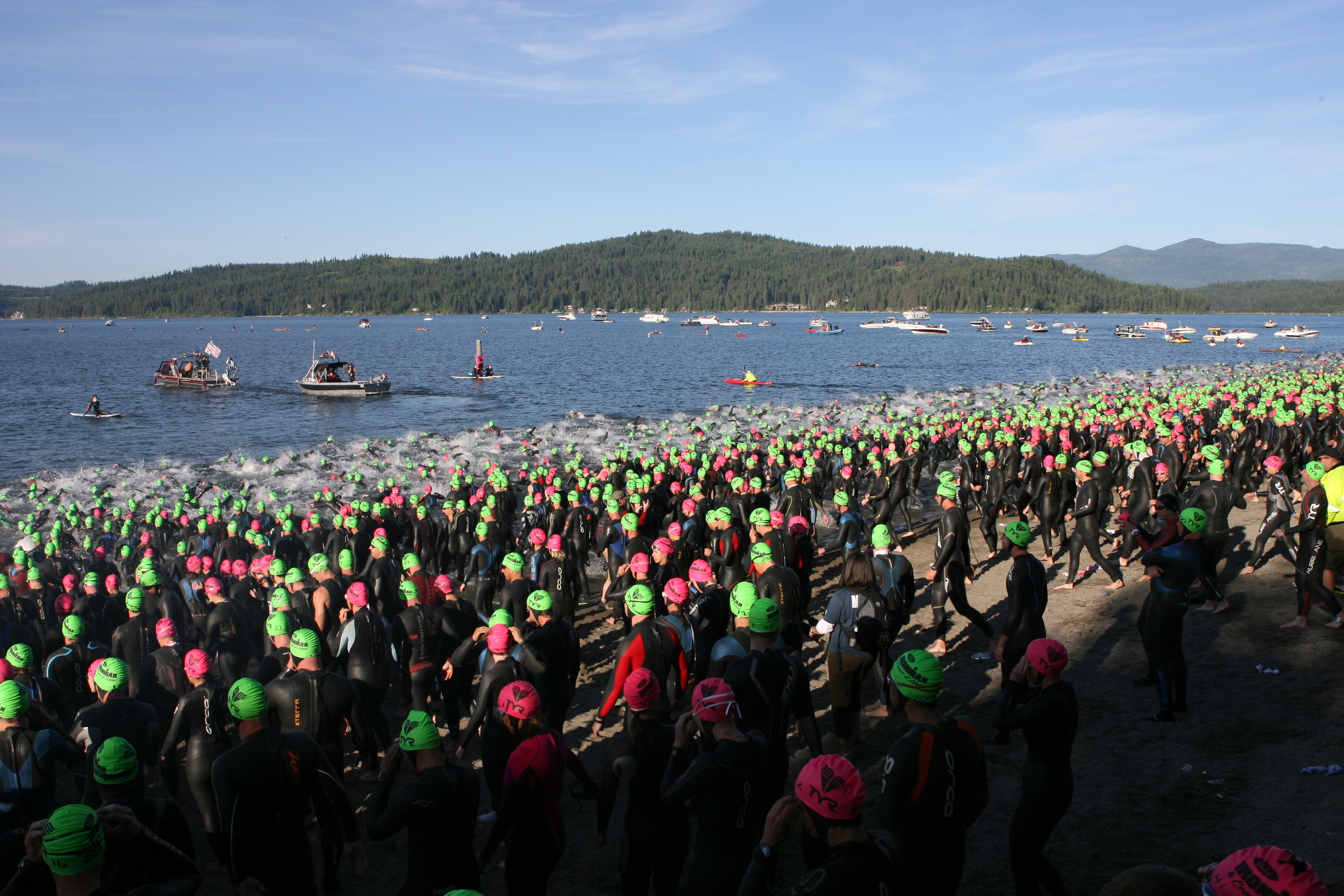
Start of Ironman Coeur d'Alene, 2011

Ironman Coeur d'Alene is an Ironman Triathlon hosted in Coeur d'Alene which alternates between full- and half-distance Ironman events on a rotating basis from year to year. The course takes athletes takes athletes through a 2.4-mile (3.9 km) double-loop swim in Lake Coeur d'Alene before transitioning to a 112-mile (180 km) double-loop bike course that is routed along the lake and then through the countryside, ending in a 26.2-mile (42.2 km) multiple-loop run through McEuen Park to a finish in downtown on Sherman Ave.

=== Roller sports ===
==== Roller Derby ====
In roller sports, there is the amateur Lilac City Roller Derby, a flat track roller derby league that features a women's team, an affiliated men's team, and a supported junior roller derby team. The Lilac City Roller Derby is a member of the Women's Flat Track Derby Association (WFTDA). Pattison's North is one of the most popular roller rinks in the area.

==== Skateboarding ====
For skateboarding, the City of Spokane Department of Parks and Recreation operates three skateparks, the Hillyard Skateboard Park, the Dwight Merkel Skatepark, and a third in Riverfront Parks North Bank playground.

=== Golf ===
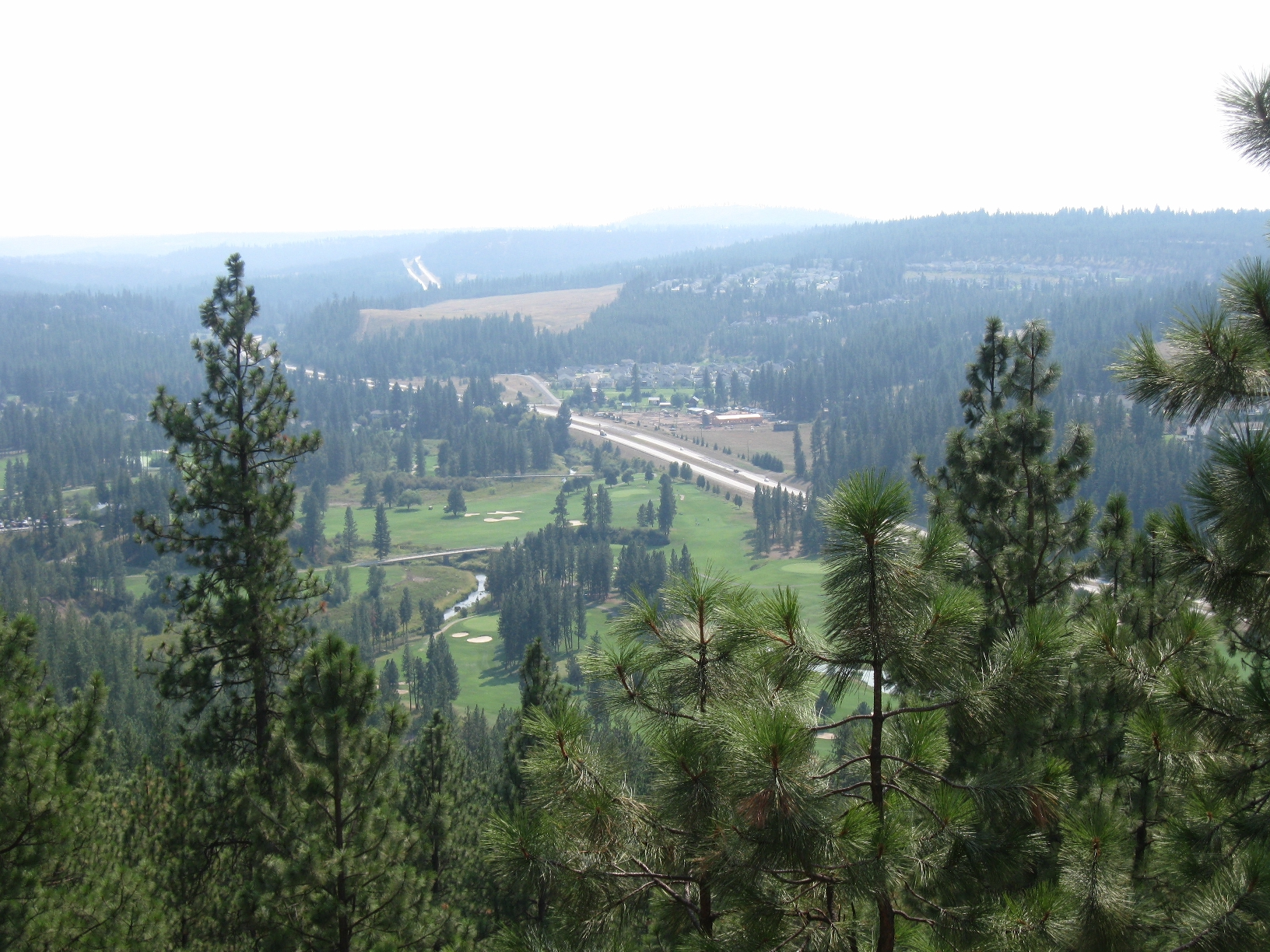
The Creek at Qualchan Golf Course from High Drive Bluff Park in Spokane

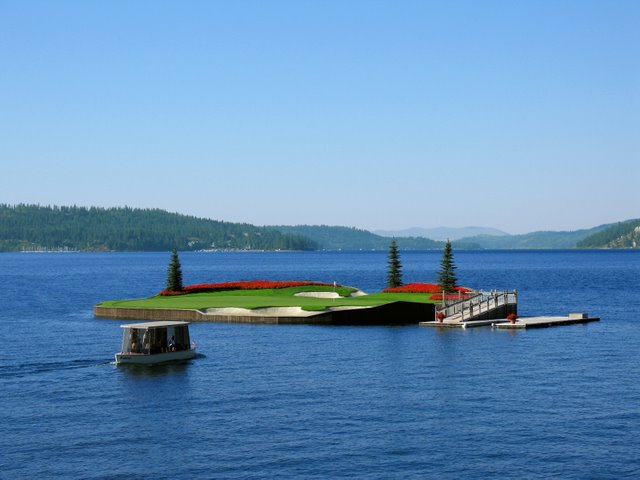
The Coeur d'Alene Resorts Floating Green (14th Hole) in Coeur d'Alene

Spokane has 13 golf courses in and around the city. The city has an avid and growing golf community and has a municipal golf course collection with seven in total, that can offer golfing for an affordable price. Four of the municipal courses are city run (The Creek at Qualchan, Esmeralda Golf Course, and Downriver Golf Course) and three are run by the county (Liberty Lake Golf Course, MeadowWood Golf Course, and Hangman Valley Golf Course). Other municipal or public 18-hole golf courses include the Wandermere Golf Course and Deer Park Golf Course in north Spokane County and the Fairways Golf Course in Cheney. The most noteworthy of the system is the Indian Canyon Golf Course which was designed by Chandler Egan (who had a part in designing Pebble Beach) and opened in 1935. The course formerly hosted the Esmeralda Open on the PGA Tour, and hosted three U.S. amateur golfing championships in 1941, 1984, and 1989 and currently hosts the Rosauers Open Invitational, an annual Pacific Northwest PGA event. It also hosted the Spokane Women's Open on the LPGA Tour from 1959 to 1963. Manito Golf and Country Club, a private golf club on the South Hill, hosted the 1944 PGA Championship and the Spokane Country Club (now the Kalispel Golf and Country Club) in north Spokane hosted the first championship of the U.S. Women's Open in 1946. The Athletic Round Table headed by Joe Albi organized the tournament events held in the city in the 1940s.

Across the border in Idaho, Coeur d'Alene has become a destination for golf enthusiasts. The city is home to five golf courses and there are another eight more within 20 miles (32 km). The most notable courses include the Coeur d'Alene Resort Golf Course with its unique 14th hole floating green, Circling Raven Golf Club at the Coeur d'Alene Casino resort in Worley, and the private Tom Fazio-designed Gozzer Ranch near Eddyville, Idaho.

=== Hiking ===
Many of the area parks have maintained trails. Some of the most popular are not far from the city such as the Bowl and Pitcher in Riverside State Park, the Rocks of Sharon in the Iller Creek Conservation Area, Kit Carson Trail in Mount Spokane State Park, and the Mineral Ridge National Recreation Trail east of Coeur d'Alene. The Bowl and Pitcher trail features the views of the Spokane River and the trails namesake rock formation and a suspension bridge built by the Civilian Conservation Corps. The Rocks of Sharon is located south of the Dishman Hills Conservation Area and features a 5-mile trail that loops around the conservation area with scenic views of the Palouse to the south and has a 250-foot rockface that is popular among climbing community. The Mineral Ridge National Scenic Trail east of Lake Coeur d'Alene is a Bureau of Land Management maintained 3.3-mile interpretive trail that showcases Lake vistas of Beauty Bay and Wolf Lodge Bay, it is popular among bird watchers during the winter who wish to see bald eagles.

=== Rock climbing ===
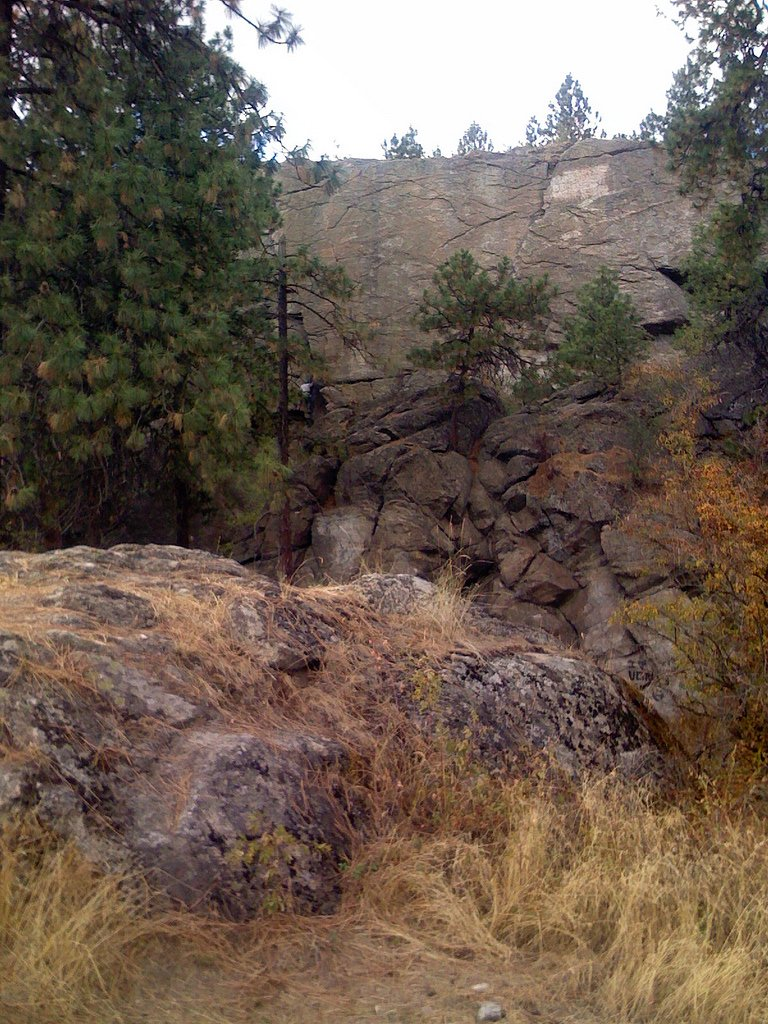
Climbers scaling a rock in Shields Park

For rock climbing, the Spokane area has a variety of climbing areas of varying difficulty not far from the city as well as some climbing gyms that feature climbing walls for bouldering. There are nine climbing areas within a half an hour drive from Spokane. Among the most popular of these locations are the Minnehaha Rocks, the Rocks of Sharon, Q'emiln Park, the McLellan Rocks, and Mirabeau Point Park. The oldest, most developed, and popular area is Minnehaha, which features over 70 climbing routes and over 100 bouldering routes. Although the Spokane area lacks major peaks, the city is centrally located to destination locales such as those in the Cascade Range, the Canadian Rockies, and the Bitterroot Range in western Montana.

Spokane has two climbing gyms within city limits, the oldest and most established being Wild Walls inside the cavernous Old State Armory Building in downtown Spokane and nearby Eastern Washington University in Cheney also has a climbing wall.

=== Spelunking ===
For caving or spelunking, Gardner Cave near Metaline in Pend Orielle County, the longest limestone cave in the state with a length of 1,055 feet (322 m), within Crawford State Park is likely the most popular option. Only the first 494 feet (151 m)are open to public access.

=== Water sports ===
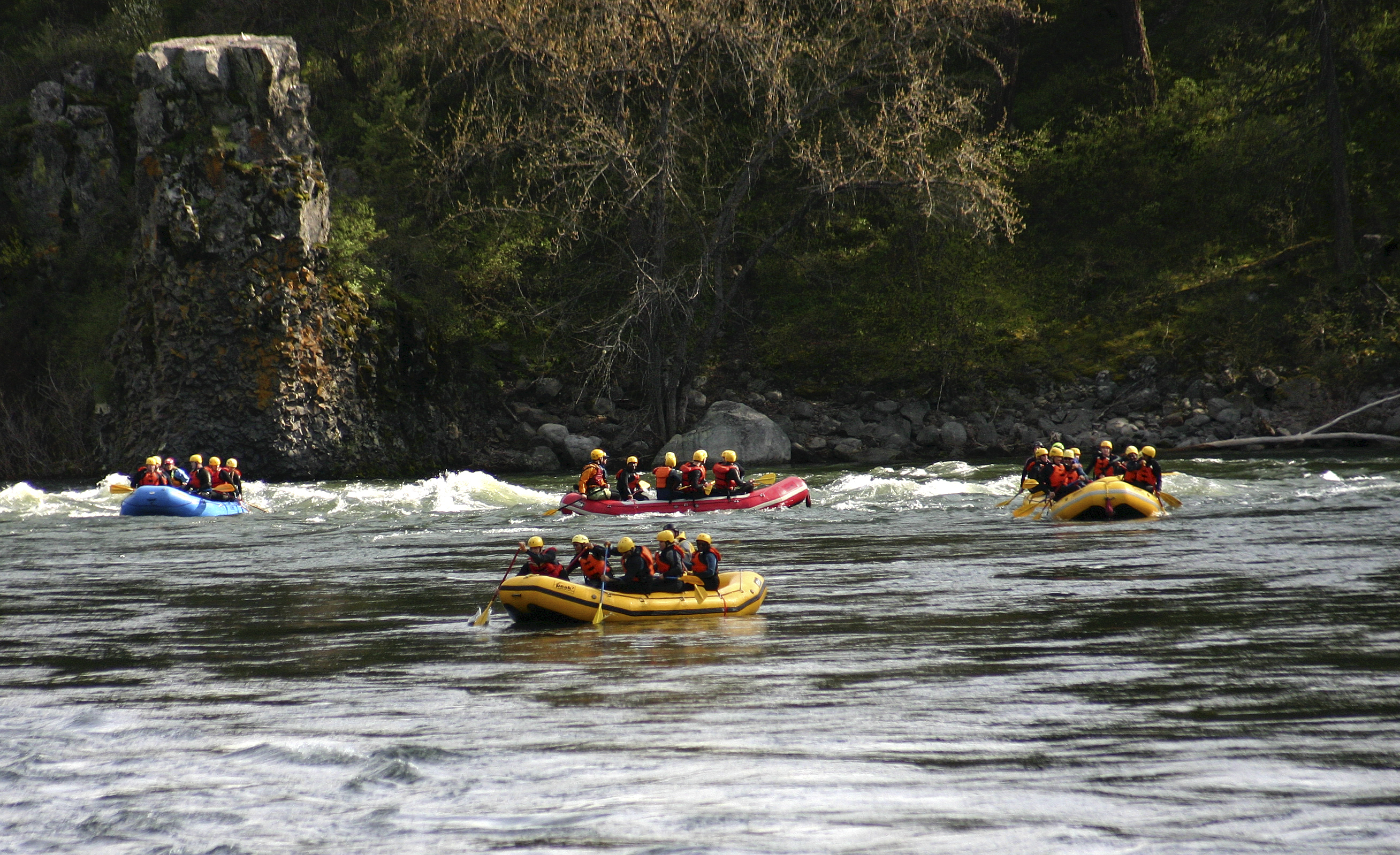
Rafting down the Spokane River

Spokane has 76 lakes for outdoor sports and recreation such as wake boarding, paddleboarding, sailing, parasailing, jet skiing, kayaking, and fishing.

The Spokane River has stretches of its waters suitable for rafting, the most difficult rapids being class III and IV. For a variety of lake recreation activities, Lake Coeur d'Alene is among the most popular destinations for area residents.

The City of Spokane maintains six outdoor aquatic centers and splash pads and Spokane County maintains two.

=== Shooting sports ===
In the shooting sports, Spokane has two clubs that have facilities in the area, the Spokane Gun Club and the Spokane Rifle Club. The Spokane Rifle Club was founded in 1916 and is located within Riverside State Park and its range facilities include a clubhouse, an outdoor rifle range, indoor and outdoor pistol ranges, as well as trap and skeet ranges. The Spokane Gun Club was founded in 1892 and has acquired new property in the West Plains of Spokane in a move from its historic home in the Spokane Valley; it plans to construct a clubhouse and trap and skeet fields.

=== Adventure sports ===
The Mica Moon Zip Tour and Aerial Park adjacent to the Mica Peak Conservation Area near Liberty Lake is a destination for zip lining and aerial trekking. The park has eight zip lines, the longest being the 3,500-foot (1,100 m) "Big Mama", which traverses a deep gorge and takes about a minute to ride. Timberline Adventures east of Coeur d'Alene has a 7-line zip course with three sky bridges over a dense coniferous forest that overlooks Lake Coeur d'Alene and Beauty Bay.

== Winter sports ==
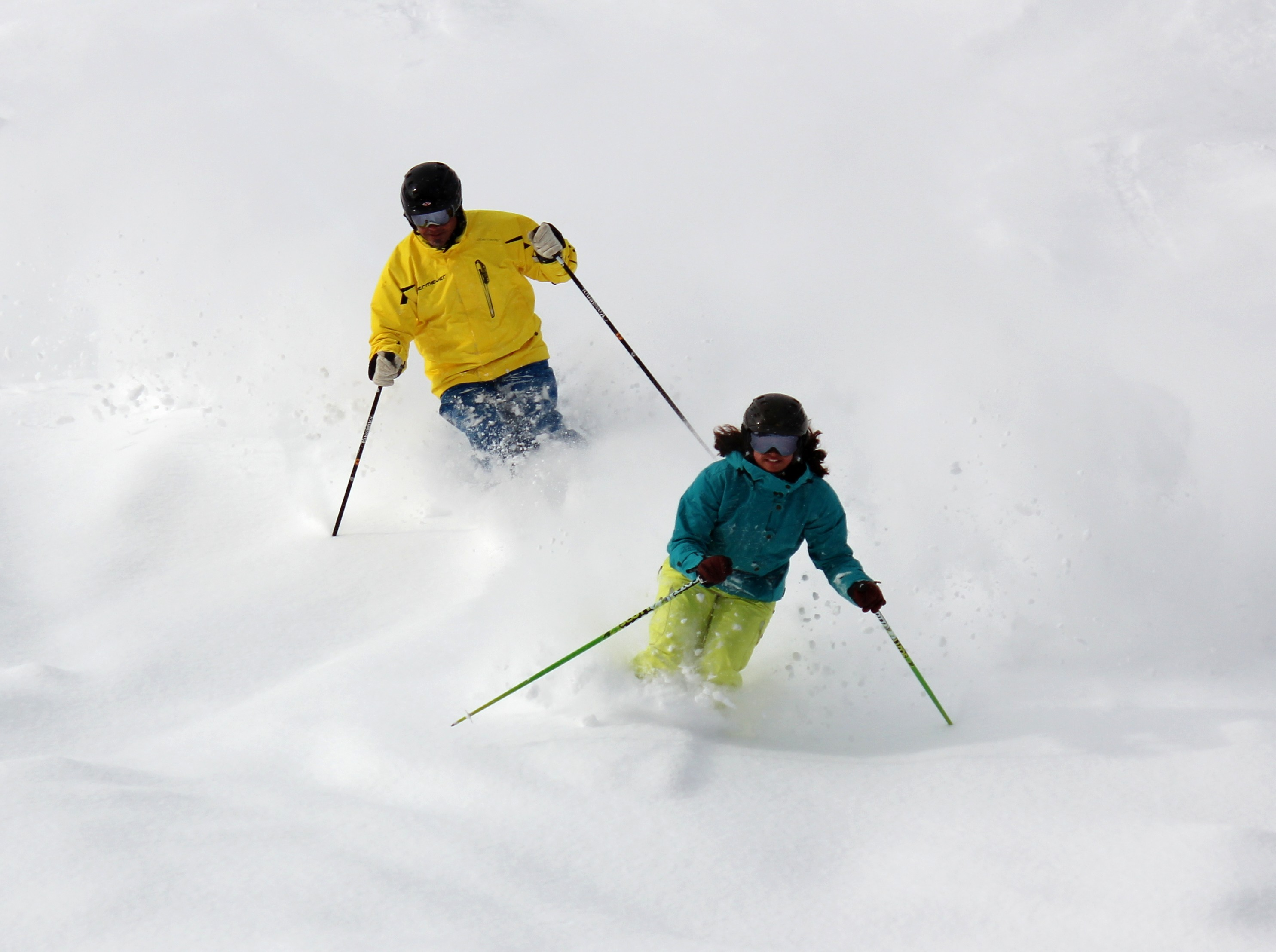
Downhill skiing at Lookout Pass

=== Skiing ===
For winter sport activities, area skiers have access to 9,552-acre (38.66 km^{2}) of skiable terrain that is said to offer consistent snow, a great variety of ski runs and experiences with minimal lift lines in comparison to more commercialized ski destinations. There are two ski resorts in northeastern Washington, Mount Spokane Ski and Snowboard Park north of Spokane and 49 Degrees North Ski Area in Chewelah as well as three major ski resorts in north Idaho, Silver Mountain Resort in Kellogg, Lookout Pass Ski and Recreation Area at Lookout Pass near Mullan, and Schweitzer Mountain Ski Resort in Sandpoint.

According to each resorts own rating systems, Mount Spokane has 52 designated runs where 23% are classified as "easiest", 62% "more difficult", and 15% "most difficult", and 49 Degrees North has 82 runs, 30% rated "beginner", 40% "intermediate", 25% "advanced", and 5% "expert". For the ski resorts in North Idaho, Schweitzer Mountain has 92 runs with 10% "beginner", 40% "intermediate", 35% "advanced", and 15% "expert", Silver Mountain has 67 runs, 20% beginner, 40% intermediate, 30% advanced, and 10% expert, and Lookout Pass has 38 runs where 20% are "easiest" 50% are "intermediate, 20% "advanced", and 10% "expert".

=== Ice hockey ===
The Eagles Ice Arena is the only ice rink in the city proper (two others are in Cheney and Coeur d'Alene). The Eagles Ice Arena is where the Spokane Braves junior "B" hockey team of the Kootenay International Junior Hockey League play their home games.

=== Curling ===
The Frontier Ice Arena just outside Coeur d'Alene is the main venue for curling in the Spokane-Coeur d'Alene area and is the home of the Inland Northwest Curling Club.

== Motorsport ==
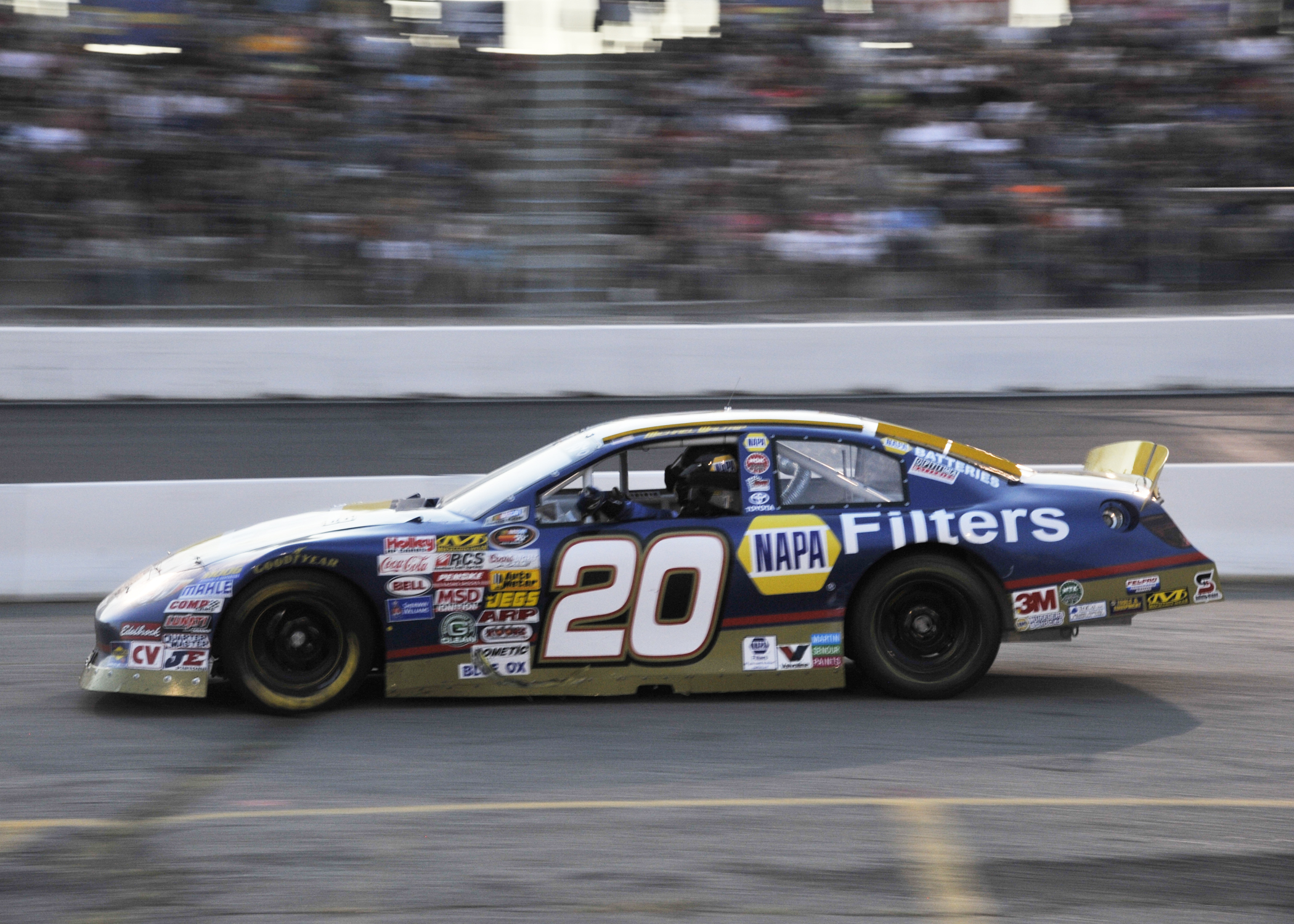
K&N NASCAR Pro Series West race at the Spokane County Raceway

Motorsport activities and events such as stock car racing are hosted at the Spokane County Raceway which features an oval track, road course and a dragstrip; the facility is operated by Spokane County and is also used by local law enforcement for training purposes.
