= Jeremy McComb =

American singer-songwriter

- Born: Jerome McComb
- Origin: Idaho, United States
- Genres: Country
- Occupation: Singer-songwriter
- Instrument: Vocals
- Years active: 2004–present
- Label: New Revolution
- Website: http://www.jeremymccomb.com/

Jerome "Jeremy" McComb (born in Idaho) is an American country music artist and former tour manager for comedian Larry the Cable Guy. In 2008, he signed to Parallel/New Revolution Records and released his debut album My Side of Town that year. This album produced the singles "Wagon Wheel", "This Town Needs a Bar" and "Cold". Although the first two singles did not chart, "Cold" has become his first entry on the Billboard country charts, debuting at No. 58 in November.

== Biography ==
Jeremy McComb was born in Idaho. His father, Bob, was a local musician who played six nights a week and regularly brought him to venues where he performed. McComb made his singing debut at age eight, when his father invited him to join him onstage to sing Willie Nelson's "On the Road Again". Later on, McComb found work as a music director and disc jockey at the radio station KIXZ-FM in Spokane, Washington. He then befriended comedian Larry the Cable Guy while working at the station, and was hired as the comedian's tour manager in 2004 at age 23.

McComb began working on his music while serving as Larry's manager. While with the comedian, he was introduced to J.P. Williams, the CEO of Parallel Entertainment. He was then sent to a studio in Spartanburg, South Carolina, where he began recording his debut album. Initially, it was to have been released on a division of Warner Bros. Records, but legal difficulties forced Williams to release it on his own label instead. Entitled My Side of Town, it was released on Parallel/New Revolution in June 2008, and was produced by Paul Riddle of the Marshall Tucker Band. The first single from the album, "Wagon Wheel," was originally recorded by Bob Dylan and later by the Old Crow Medicine Show and Darius Rucker. Following it was "This Town Needs a Bar," which was written by Liz Rose and Jimmy Yeary, and was originally featured in the soundtrack to the film Larry the Cable Guy: Health Inspector. The first two singles both failed to chart, although the third single, "Cold", debuted at number 58 on the Billboard country charts in November 2008 and peaked at number 43.

Country Weekly magazine gave My Side of Town three-and-a-half stars out of five, calling it "one of the year's most encouraging [albums]". "Cold" received a favorable review from the country music review site Roughstock, whose critic Matt Bjorke called it "a ballad which details the difficulties that people sometimes have in getting over a relationship…McComb sings about feeling numb, or 'Cold' about the way that the relationship ended."

Following his major label debut McComb independently released an EP titled "Leap and the Net will Appear". Which included the song "Easy as breathing" co-written with Kevin Kadish (Meghan Trainor / Jason Mraz producer & collaborator) The song while never worked as a single picked up AirPlay across the country.

== Discography ==
=== Albums ===
Title	Album details
My Side of Town	Release date: May 13, 2008; Label: Parallel/New Revolution
Leap & the Net Will Appear	Release date: October 11, 2011; Label: McCombOVER Records
FM	Release date: January 1, 2016; Label: McComBover/Rukkus Room Records
Troublemaker LIVE	Label: NoodleRoo Music: Released Jan 5th 2018; Double Live album (35 Tracks); Recorded over 2 shows in Clinton, WI; Produced by Nick Gibbens
Frontier Rock	Release June 18th 2021; Label: Average Joes Entertainment; Produced by: Nick Gibbens
The Way Back	Released September 9th 2022; Label: Average Joes Entertainment; Produced by: Nick Gibbens

=== Singles ===
Year	Single	Peak positions	Album
Year	Single	US Country	Album
2007	"Wagon Wheel"	—	My Side of Town
2008	"This Town Needs a Bar"	—	My Side of Town
2008	"Cold"	43	My Side of Town
2010	"Cherry Chapstick"	—	Leap & the Net Will Appear
2011	"5 to Midnight"	—	Leap & the Net Will Appear
2012	"Easy as Breathing' "	-	Leap and the net will appear
2016	"Love Song"	-	FM
2016	"Didn't we"	-	FM
2021	"Cottons gettin' High "		Frontier Rock
2021	"Withdrawals"		Frontier Rock
2021	"Under Glass"		Frontier Rock
2021	"13 Steps"		Single
2022	"Burned Out"		The Way Back
2022	"Back Before I knew ya" (Featuring Caroline Jones)		The Way Back
2022	"Every road"		The Way Back
2023	"Christmas on the Line"		Single
2024	"Long December"		Single (Counting crows "A long December" cover)
"—" denotes releases that did not chart

=== Music videos ===
Year	Video	Director
2007	"Wagon Wheel"	Lark Watts
2008	"This Town Needs a Bar"	Roman White
2014	"Love Song"	Jamie Tate
