= KISC =

- Spokane, Washington; United States
- Broadcast area: Spokane metropolitan area
- Frequency: 98.1 MHz (HD Radio)
- Branding: Kiss 98.1

Programming
- Format: Adult contemporary
- Subchannels: HD2: Country "Kix 99.3"
- Affiliations: Premiere Networks

Ownership
- Owner: iHeartMedia, Inc.; (iHM Licenses, LLC)
- Sister stations: KCDA, KFOO-FM, KKZX, KQNT, KZFS

History
- First air date: February 16, 1961
- Former call signs: KHQ-FM (1961–1985)
- Call sign meaning: Sounds like "Kiss"

Technical information
- Licensing authority: FCC
- Facility ID: 60419
- Class: C
- ERP: 92,100 watts; (94,000 watts with beam tilt)
- HAAT: 619 meters (2,031 ft)
- Transmitter coordinates: 47.581°N 117.297°W
- Translator: HD2: 99.3 K257FX (Spokane)

Links
- Public license information: Public file; LMS
- Webcast: Listen live (via iHeartRadio); HD2: Listen live (via iHeartRadio)
- Website: kiss981.iheart.com; HD2: kix993.iheart.com

KISC (98.1 FM) is a commercial radio station in Spokane, Washington. It is owned by iHeartMedia and airs an adult contemporary radio format, switching to Christmas music for much of November and December. The station has local DJs during the day and carries the syndicated "Delilah" show in the evening from Premiere Networks, an iHeart subsidiary. The station calls itself "KISS 98.1", using a logo trademarked by iHeart, mostly associated with Top 40 stations that also call themselves "KISS-FM".

KISC's radio studios and offices are on East Sprague Avenue in Spokane. Its transmitter is in off South Krell Ridge Lane in Spokane, on Krell Hill, also known as "Tower Mountain". KISC broadcasts in the HD Radio format. Its HD2 digital subchannel plays country music as "KIX 99.3" feeding FM translator K257FX at 99.3 MHz.

== History ==
=== KHQ-FM ===
On February 16, 1961, the station first signed on as KHQ-FM. It was the FM counterpart to KHQ (590 AM, now KQNT). The two radio stations, and KHQ-TV, were owned by The Spokesman-Review, a daily newspaper in Spokane. At first, KHQ-FM simulcast the AM station, but it soon switched to an automated beautiful music format on March 27, 1961.

In the early 1970s, KHQ-FM flipped to a Top 40 format. At first, the contemporary version of KHQ-FM was also largely automated, but over time, DJs were added. In the 1970s, most radios were still not able to receive FM signals, and Spokane already had two popular Top 40 stations, KJRB (790 AM) and KREM (970 AM, now KTTO). At first, KHQ-FM was not much of a factor in the ratings, but as more listeners acquired FM radios, the station's ratings improved. Eventually, the AM stations switched to other formats.

=== KISC debuts ===
In 1985, KHQ Incorporated decided to keep its TV station but sold off the radio stations to Lilac City Broadcasting. In those days, call signs could not be shared if the different stations were not co-owned. KHQ-TV kept its call letters, while the radio stations switched. The AM station became KLSN and the FM station became KISC, known as "Kiss-FM 98". In 1984, former album rock station KREM-FM became Top 40-formatted KZZU, and the stations were locked in a battle as Spokane's two big Top 40 outlets on FM.

Logo under previous slogan

As hard rock and rap music began to dominate the Top 40 charts, KISC shifted to Adult Top 40 and eventually to an upbeat adult contemporary format. KISC aired a popular locally based "Love Notes" request show like the Delilah love songs program they air today. In the 1990s, KISC would take potshots at KXLY-FM, which had made the transition from easy listening to soft adult contemporary, as KISC accused KXLY-FM of playing too much "soft sleepy music". When KXLY-FM flipped to adult alternative and then to country music, KISC became Spokane's only mainstream adult contemporary station.

In March 2020, KISC's HD2 sub-channel dropped "UP! 98.1 HD2" and adopted the country format of KZFS and the "Kix 99.3" branding (the frequency being in reference to FM translator 99.3 K257FX, with KISC-HD2 now being the primary relay station for it). Subsequently, KZFS began simulcasting on new translator 101.5 K268DL and flipped to classic hip hop.

=== Ownership changes ===
In 1996, KISC and AM 590, then called KAQQ, were bought by Triathlon Broadcasting. In 1999, ownership was passed to AMFM Broadcasting. One year later, AMFM was acquired by Clear Channel Communications, the forerunner to current owner iHeartMedia.
