= KCDA =

Coordinates: 47.581°N 117.297°W

- Post Falls, Idaho; United States
- Broadcast area: Spokane-Coeur d'Alene
- Frequency: 103.1 MHz (HD Radio)
- Branding: 103.1 KCDA

Programming
- Format: Hot adult contemporary
- Affiliations: Premiere Networks

Ownership
- Owner: iHeartMedia, Inc.; (iHM Licenses, LLC)
- Sister stations: KISC, KKZX, KFOO-FM, KZFS, KQNT

History
- First air date: June 29, 1979 (as KIOB)
- Former call signs: KIOB (1979–1983)
- Call sign meaning: Coeur D'Alene

Technical information
- Licensing authority: FCC
- Facility ID: 57625
- Class: C1
- ERP: 18,500 watts
- HAAT: 531 meters

Links
- Public license information: Public file; LMS
- Webcast: Listen live (via iHeartRadio)
- Website: 1031kcda.iheart.com

KCDA (103.1 FM) is a hot adult contemporary outlet owned by iHeartMedia. The station offers up a mix of familiar new music with less talk. Its city of license is Post Falls, Idaho, and it serves the Spokane area at an effective radiated power of 18.5 kW.

== History ==
KCDA was a country music station from 1991 until its flip to its current format in 1999.

After KEZE flipped from AAA to Rhythmic CHR in 2012, KCDA added more Adult Alternative product, becoming a hybrid of Hot AC/AAA. Recently, KCDA went back to a straight forward hot AC format. KCDA has been Spokane's home for American Top 40 with Ryan Seacrest since sister station KPXR flipped back to country. They are now alternative KFOO-FM. KCDA competes with 92.9 ZZU.
