= KKZX =

- Spokane, Washington; United States
- Broadcast area: Spokane metropolitan area
- Frequency: 98.9 MHz (HD Radio)
- Branding: 98.9 KKZX

Programming
- Format: Classic rock
- Subchannels: HD2: KQNT simulcast (News/talk)

Ownership
- Owner: iHeartMedia, Inc.; (iHM Licenses, LLC)
- Sister stations: KCDA, KISC, KFOO-FM, KZFS, KQNT

History
- First air date: May 15, 1976
- Former call signs: KICN (1975–1985); KQSP (1985–1988)

Technical information
- Licensing authority: FCC
- Facility ID: 53146
- Class: C
- ERP: 100,000 watts
- HAAT: 490 meters (1,610 ft)
- Transmitter coordinates: 47.593°N 117.297°W

Links
- Public license information: Public file; LMS
- Webcast: Listen live (via iHeartRadio)
- Website: 989kkzx.iheart.com

KKZX (98.9 FM) is a classic rock radio station serving the Spokane, Washington area. The station offers up a steady diet of rock music hits from the 1960s to the early 1990s.

In April 2023, KKZX massaged their logs to an 80's based Classic Rock format.

Personalities on the station includes: Woody & Wilcox in the morning (6a-10a), Maria Milito (10a-3p), Bud Stew "Bill Stewart" Drive Home Show (3p-7p). Big Rig (7p-12M) KKZX Station alumn include: Jim Arnold, Laura Hall, and Jason McCollim. The station broadcasts with an ERP of 100 kW and is owned by iHeartMedia.

Programming is also heard on 100.9 K265AV Bonners Ferry, Idaho, serving Boundary County where FM reception is difficult due to mountainous terrain, K265AV now broadcasts a simulcast of KZBD-FM.
