= Spokane Hoopfest =

Outdoor basketball tournament

Hoopfest
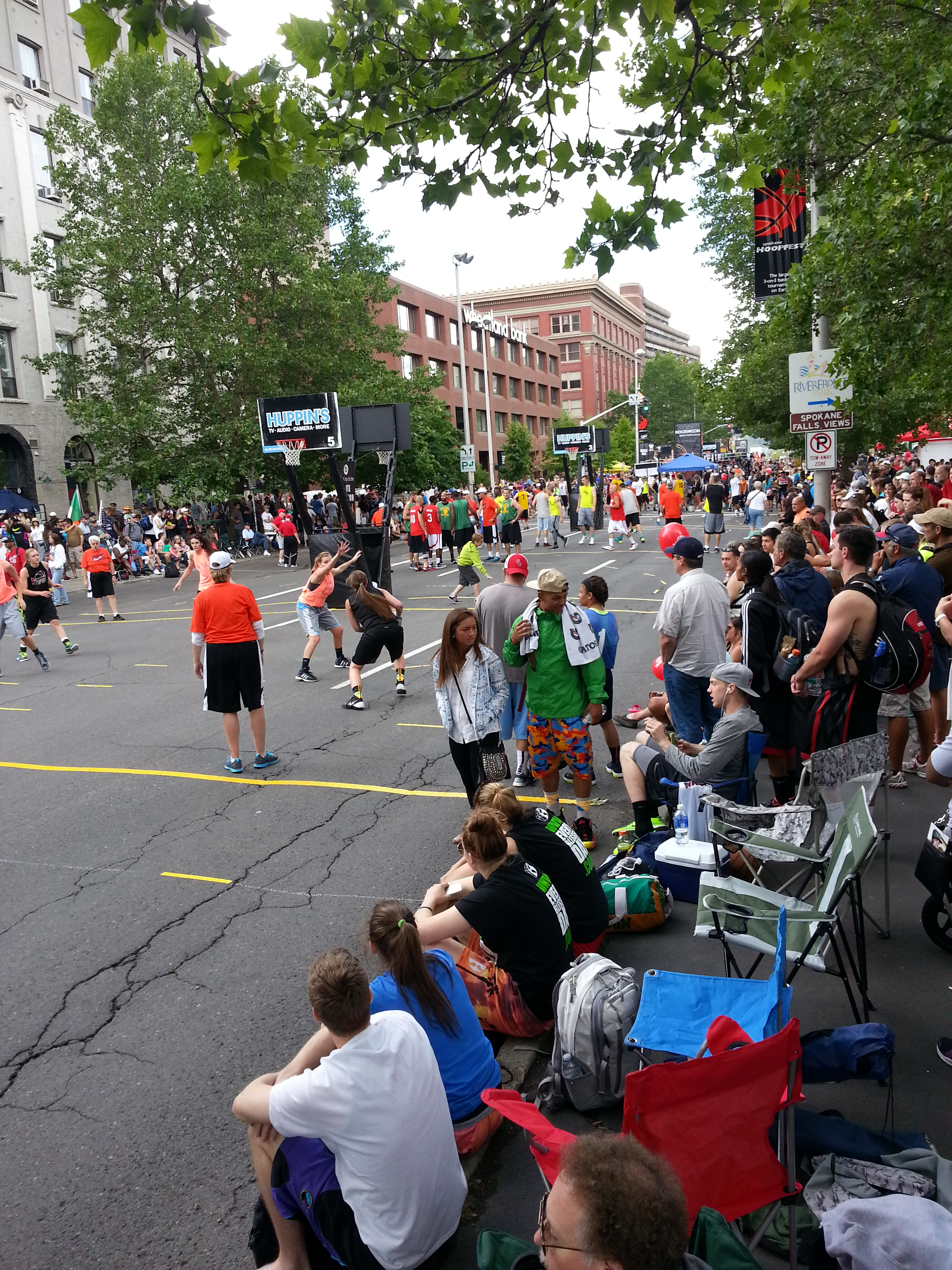
- Courts set up on West Spokane Falls Blvd next to Riverfront park in downtown Spokane, June 2014.
- Status: Active
- Genre: Festival, Sporting Event
- Date: Last weekend in June.
- Frequency: Annually
- Locations: Spokane, Washington (Downtown Spokane)
- Coordinates: 47.6614769°N 117.4184936°W
- Country: United States
- Founded: 1990; 36 years ago
- Participants: 24,000
- Attendance: 253,000
- Area: 42 City Blocks
- Major events: 3-on-3 Basketball
- Website: www.spokanehoopfest.net

Hoopfest is an annual outdoor 3-on-3 basketball tournament held in Downtown Spokane, Washington.

In 2011, the event drew 27,876 players on 7,040 teams. It is estimated that around 175,000 fans visited the event in both 2010 and 2011.
