= KFOO-FM =

Coordinates: 47.570°N 117.083°W

- Opportunity, Washington; United States
- Broadcast area: Spokane, Washington
- Frequency: 96.1 MHz (HD Radio)
- Branding: Alt 96.1

Programming
- Format: Alternative rock
- Affiliations: Compass Media Networks; Premiere Networks

Ownership
- Owner: iHeartMedia; (iHM Licenses, LLC)
- Sister stations: KCDA, KISC, KKZX, KZFS, KQNT

History
- First air date: April 1, 1961 (as KZUN-FM)
- Former call signs: KZUN-FM (1961–1982); KKPL (1982–1985); KKPL-FM (1985–1992); KNFR (1992–2001); KIXZ-FM (2001–2013); KPXR-FM (2013–2014); KIIX-FM (2014–2018)
- Call sign meaning: Foo Fighters

Technical information
- Licensing authority: FCC
- Facility ID: 60422
- Class: C
- ERP: 60,000 watts
- HAAT: 744 meters (2,441 ft)

Links
- Public license information: Public file; LMS
- Webcast: Listen live (via iHeartRadio)
- Website: alt961.iheart.com

KFOO-FM (96.1 MHz, "Alt 96.1") is an alternative rock radio station serving the Spokane area of Washington, United States. It broadcasts with an ERP of 60,000 watts and is licensed to Opportunity, Washington. It is owned by iHeartMedia.

== History ==
The station signed on the air in 1961 as KZUN-FM. It would later become KKPL in 1982 broadcasting an adult contemporary format, known as "96 Apple FM". By the mid-1980s, the station had a mixed flavor of adult contemporary and Top 40 formats, known as "K-96.1" and "LITE 96".

By the 1990s, LITE 96 was competing in a crowded field for adult contemporary music between KISC and Classy 99.9. In 1992, the station flipped to country music as KNFR, under such brands as K-Frog and Kicks, and later KIXZ-FM "Kix 96" in 2001.

On March 24, 2012, the station flipped to a Top 40/CHR format as Hits 96.1, with an entirely-syndicated lineup of shows. Listeners were unhappy with the sudden drop of the country music format. On September 20, 2013, the station rebranded as Power 96.1, with no change in format. The station changed its calls to KPXR-FM. On May 8, 2014, KPXR-FM returned to country and the "Kix" brand as Kix 96.1. At the same time, the call letters were changed to KIIX-FM. It was due to rating and listener dissatisfaction with the pop format.

On March 2, 2018, KIIX-FM moved its programming and branding to sister KZFS, and began running promos redirecting listeners to the new frequency. The station re-launched as alternative rock Alt 96.1 on March 5. The station changed its call letters to KFOO-FM (which, like its previous usage in Tacoma, is in reference to the Seattle-based alternative band Foo Fighters).

== Notable former staff ==
- Jeremy McComb (2003–2004). Currently a country singer, best known for his hit singles "Wagon Wheel", "This Town Needs A Bar", and "Cold One".
