= Supertramp discography =

Cataloging of published recordings by Supertramp

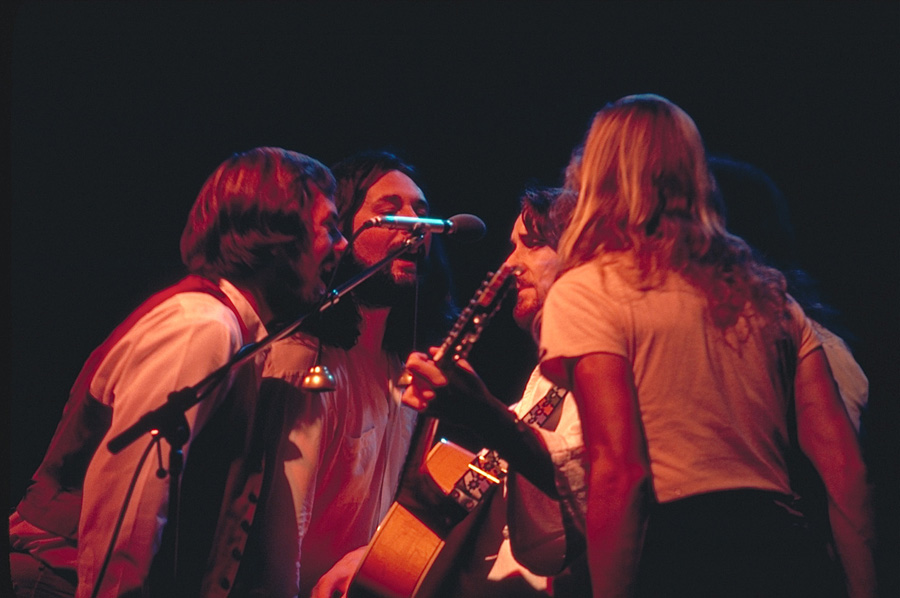
- Supertramp during the "Breakfast In Europe" Tour in 1980
- Studio albums: 11
- Live albums: 6
- Compilation albums: 4
- Singles: 28
- Video albums: 2
- Music videos: 21

The discography of the British rock band Supertramp includes 11 studio albums, six live albums, five compilation albums, and 28 singles.

== Albums ==
=== Studio albums ===
List of studio albums, with selected chart positions and certifications
Year	Album details	Peak chart positions										Certifications (sales thresholds)
Year	Album details	UK	AUS	CAN	FRA	GER	NL	NOR	SWE	SWI	US	Certifications (sales thresholds)
1970	Supertramp: Released: August 1970; Label: A&M; Formats: CD, LP	—	—	—	—	—	—	—	—	—	—	MC: Gold; SNEP: Gold
1971	Indelibly Stamped: Released: 25 June 1971; Label: A&M; Formats: CD, LP	—	53	—	—	—	—	—	—	—	158	MC: Gold; SNEP: Gold
1974	Crime of the Century: Released: 25 October 1974; Label: A&M; Formats: CD, LP	4	15	4	19	5	25	—	—	17	38	ARIA: Gold; BPI: Gold; MC: Diamond; SNEP: Platinum; BVMI: Gold; IFPI SWI: Gold; RIAA: Gold
1975	Crisis? What Crisis?: Released: 28 November 1975; Label: A&M; Formats: CD, LP	20	20	12	—	—	11	10	16	13	44	ARIA: Gold; BPI: Silver; MC: Platinum; SNEP: Gold; BVMI: Gold
1977	Even in the Quietest Moments...: Released: 8 April 1977; Label: A&M; Formats: CD, LP	12	5	1	4	14	1	3	5	4	16	BPI: Silver; MC: Platinum; SNEP: Platinum; BVMI: Gold; IFPI SWI: Platinum; RIAA: Gold
1979	Breakfast in America: Released: 16 March 1979; Label: A&M; Formats: CD, LP	3	1	1	1	1	1	1	2	1	1	BPI: Platinum; MC: Diamond; SNEP: Platinum; BVMI: Platinum; NVPI: Platinum; IFPI SWI: Gold; RIAA: 4× Platinum
1982	...Famous Last Words...: Released: 29 October 1982; Label: A&M; Formats: CD, LP	6	1	1	1	1	1	2	5	1	5	BPI: Gold; ARIA: Platinum; MC: Platinum; SNEP: Platinum; BVMI: Platinum; NVPI: Gold; RIAA: Gold
1985	Brother Where You Bound: Released: 13 May 1985; Label: A&M; Formats: CD, LP	20	22	11	3	4	4	6	7	2	21	MC: Platinum; SNEP: Gold; BVMI: Gold
1987	Free as a Bird: Released: 23 October 1987; Label: A&M; Formats: CD, LP	93	30	34	24	23	32	—	28	14	101	MC: Gold; SNEP: Gold; IFPI SWI: Gold
1997	Some Things Never Change: Released: 24 March 1997; Label: EMI, Oxygen (US); Formats: CD, LP	74	—	44	2	3	12	19	—	2	—	SNEP: 2× Gold; IFPI SWI: Platinum
2002	Slow Motion: Released: 23 April 2002; Label: EMI, Silver Cab (U.S./Canada); Formats: CD, LP	—	—	—	8	17	83	—	—	6	—	SNEP: Gold; IFPI SWI: Gold

=== Live albums ===
Year	Album details	Peak chart positions										Certifications (sales thresholds)
Year	Album details	UK	AUS	AUT	CAN	FRA	GER	NLD	NOR	SWI	US	Certifications (sales thresholds)
1980	Paris: Released: 26 September 1980; Label: A&M	7	3	7	3	9	5	2	6	1	8	BPI: Gold; MC: Platinum; SNEP: Gold; BVMI: Gold; RIAA: Gold
1988	Live '88: Released: 28 October 1988; Label: A&M	—	—	—	—	—	50	—	—	—	—	
1999	It Was the Best of Times: Released: 12 April 1999; Label: EMI France	91	—	42	—	3	29	21	19	12	—	SNEP: Gold
2001	Is Everybody Listening?: Released: 6 November 2001; Label: A&M	—	—	—	—	—	—	—	—	—	—	
2006	Live, 1997: Released: 2006; Label: EMI	—	—	—	—	—	—	—	—	—	—	
2010	70-10 Tour: Released: 2010 (each concert); Label: Simfy Live	—	—	—	—	—	—	—	—	—	—	

- Live, 1997 was previously released as It Was the Best of Times in April 1999. It offers 13 highlights from a rejuvenated group captured as part of their hundred-date It's About Time world tour. The group's first foray into live work in almost a decade was organized to promote a comeback LP Some Things Never Change, which had been released in March 1997. The tracks that make up this live collection were extracted from the Royal Albert Hall shows from September 1997.
- Live In Paris '79 (2025) is an updated, expanded version from their Paris shows in 1979. (The first Paris was released in 1980.)

=== Compilation albums ===
Year	Album details	Peak chart positions										Certifications (sales thresholds)
Year	Album details	UK	AUT	BEL	CAN	GER	NL	NOR	SWE	SWI	US	Certifications (sales thresholds)
1986	The Autobiography of Supertramp (expanded version 'Classics' released in 1987): Released: 10 October 1986; Label: A&M	9	—	15	12	45	61	—	—	—	—	BPI: Platinum; IFPI SWI: Gold; RIAA: Platinum
1990	The Very Best of Supertramp: Released: June 1990; Label: A&M	8	27	34	17	6	1	5	5	7	—	ARIA: Gold; BPI: Platinum; MC: 2× Platinum; SNEP: Platinum; BVMI: Gold; IFPI SWI: Platinum
1992	The Very Best of Supertramp 2: Released: November 1992; Label: A&M	—	—	—	—	63	67	48	14	27	—	SNEP: Gold; MC: Gold
2005	Retrospectacle – The Supertramp Anthology: Released: 18 October 2005; Label: A&M	9	33	29	80	47	22	6	3	11	—	BPI: 2× Platinum

== Singles ==
Year	Title	UK	AUS	AUT	CAN	FRA	GER	IRE	ITA	NLD	US	Certifications	Album
1971	"Your Poppa Don't Mind"	—	—	—	—	—	—	—	—	—	—		Indelibly Stamped
1974	"Land Ho"	—	—	—	—	—	—	—	—	—	—		Non-album single
1974	"Dreamer" b/w "Bloody Well Right"	13 —	47 —	— —	75; 49	— —	— —	— —	6 —	— —	— 35		Crime of the Century
1975	"Lady"	—	—	—	—	—	—	15	—	—	—		Crisis? What Crisis?
1976	"Ain't Nobody But Me"	—	—	—	64	—	—	—	—	—	—		Crisis? What Crisis?
1977	"Give a Little Bit"	29	43	—	8	59	29	—	—	2	15	BPI: Platinum	Even in the Quietest Moments...
1977	"Babaji"	—	—	—	—	—	—	—	—	—	—		Even in the Quietest Moments...
1979	"The Logical Song"	7	16	14	1	2	12	6	45	13	6	BPI: Platinum; CAN: Platinum; FRA: Gold	Breakfast in America
1979	"Breakfast in America"	9	—	16	—	—	23	6	—	14	62	BPI: Platinum	Breakfast in America
1979	"Goodbye Stranger"	57	—	—	6	3	—	—	41	41	15	BPI: Silver; CAN: Gold	Breakfast in America
1979	"Take the Long Way Home"	—	—	—	4	14	—	—	—	—	10		Breakfast in America
1980	"Dreamer (live)"	—	39	—	1	44	—	—	—	31	15		Paris
1980	"Take the Long Way Home (live)"	—	—	—	—	—	53	—	—	32	—		Paris
1980	"Breakfast in America (live)"	—	—	—	—	—	—	—	—	—	62		Paris
1982	"It's Raining Again"	26	11	7	1	1	3	16	33	6	11	CAN: Gold	...Famous Last Words...
1982	"Crazy"	—	—	—	—	—	—	—	—	—	—		...Famous Last Words...
1983	"My Kind of Lady"	—	—	—	—	27	74	—	—	—	31		...Famous Last Words...
1983	"Don't Leave Me Now"	—	—	—	—	—	—	—	—	—	—		...Famous Last Words...
1983	"School"	—	—	—	—	—	—	—	—	(Note: re-released in 1989, hit # 27)	—		Crime of the Century
1985	"Cannonball" (Note: Also reached #9 on the US dance chart.)	—	63	—	24	19	60	—	30	39	28		Brother Where You Bound
1985	"Still in Love"	—	—	—	—	—	—	—	—	—	—		Brother Where You Bound
1985	"Better Days"	—	—	—	—	52	—	—	—	—	—		Brother Where You Bound
1987	"I'm Beggin' You" (Note: Also reached #1 on the US dance chart.)	—	70	—	73	68	—	—	—	—	—		Free as a Bird
1987	"Free as a Bird"	95	—	—	—	—	—	—	—	95	—		Free as a Bird
1988	"It's Alright"	—	—	—	—	—	—	—	—	—	—		Free as a Bird
1997	"You Win, I Lose"	—	—	40	38	58	63	—	—	—	—		Some Things Never Change
1997	"Listen to Me, Please"	—	—	—	—	73	—	—	—	—	—		Some Things Never Change

== Videography ==
=== Video albums ===
Year	Video
1990	The Story So Far...: Released: 1990 (VHS), 2002 (DVD); Label: A&M Records; Format: VHS, DVD
2012	Live in Paris '79: Released: 2012; Label: Eagle Rock Entertainment; Format: DVD, Blu-ray

=== Music videos ===
Year	Title	Director(s)	Album
1969	"All Along The Watchtower"	Haro Senft	Not on album
1974	"Dreamer"	Unknown	Crime of the Century
1974	"Rudy"	Unknown	Crime of the Century
1975	"School"	Live Video	Crime of the Century
1975	"Bloody Well Right"	Live Video	Crime of the Century
1975	"Hide in Your Shell"	Live Video	Crime of the Century
1975	"Asylum"	Live Video	Crime of the Century
1975	"If Everyone Was Listening"	Live Video	Crime of the Century
1975	"Crime of the Century"	Live Video	Crime of the Century
1976	"Lady"	Unknown	Crisis? What Crisis?
1976	"Sister Moonshine"	Live Video	Crisis? What Crisis?
1976	"Poor Boy"	Live Video	Crisis? What Crisis?
1976	"Another Man's Woman"	Live Video	Crisis? What Crisis?
1977	"Give a Little Bit"	Unknown	Even in the Quietest Moments...
1977	"Babaji"	Unknown	Even in the Quietest Moments...
1977	"From Now On"	Live Video	Even in the Quietest Moments...
1977	"Fool's Overture"	Live Video	Even in the Quietest Moments...
1979	"The Logical Song"	Bruce Gowers	Breakfast in America
1979	"Breakfast in America"	Bruce Gowers	Breakfast in America
1979	"Goodbye Stranger"	Bruce Gowers	Breakfast in America
1980	"Child of Vision"	Live Video	Breakfast in America
1980	"Take the Long Way Home"	Live Video	Breakfast in America
1982	"It's Raining Again"	Russell Mulcahy	...Famous Last Words...
1982	"My Kind of Lady"	Kenny Ortega	...Famous Last Words...
1983	"Crazy"	Live Video	...Famous Last Words...
1983	"Put On Your Old Brown Shoes"	Live Video	...Famous Last Words...
1983	"Waiting So Long"	Live Video	...Famous Last Words...
1985	"Cannonball"	Steve Barron	Brother Where You Bound
1985	"Better Days"	Steve Barron	Brother Where You Bound
1985	"Brother Where You Bound"	Steve Barron	Brother Where You Bound
1987	"I'm Beggin' You"	Zbigniew Rybczyński	Free as a Bird
1988	"Free as a Bird"	Michael Patterson, Candace Reckenger	Free as a Bird
1988	"It's Alright"	Live Video	Free as a Bird
1988	"Not the Moment"	Live Video	Free as a Bird
1988	"An Awful Thing to Waste"	Live Video	Free as a Bird
1988	"Where I Stand"	Live Video	Free as a Bird
1997	"You Win, I Lose"	David Hogan	Some Things Never Change
1997	"Listen to me Please"	David Hogan	Some Things Never Change
1999	"It's a Hard Work"	Live Video	Some Things Never Change
1999	"Sooner or Later"	Live Video	Some Things Never Change
1999	"And the Light"	Live Video	Some Things Never Change
2002	"Over You"	Live Video	Slow Motion

== Non-official albums (bootlegs) ==
- 1976: Live in Boston
  - School / Bloody Well Right / Sister Moonshine / Ain't Nobody But Me / Hide in Your Shell / Poor Boy / The Meaning / Just a Normal Day / Asylum / Dreamer / Rudy / If Everyone Was Listening / Another Man's Woman / Lady / Encores: Home Again / Crime of the Century
- 1976: Alien - Live in Santa Monica, California
  - School / Bloody Well Right / Sister Moonshine / Ain't Nobody But Me / Dreamer / Ruby / A Soap Box Opera / Lady
- 1979: Milwaukee Arena '79
  - School / Ain't Nobody But Me / The Logical Song / Goodbye Stranger / Sister Moonshine / Oh Darling / Hide in Your Shell / From Now On / Child of Vision / Even in the Quietest Moments / A Soapbox Opera / Asylum / Give a Little Bit / Bloody Well Right / Breakfast in America / Dreamer / Rudy / If Everyone Was Listening / Another Man's Woman / Fool's Overture / Encores: Two of Us / Crime of the Century
- 1983: Munich 1983
  - Crazy / Ain't Nobody But Me / Breakfast in America / Bloody Well Right / It's Raining Again / Put on Your Old Brown Shoes / Hide in Your Shell / Waiting So Long / Give a Little Bit / From Now On / The Logical Song / Goodbye Stranger / Dreamer / Rudy / Fool's Overture / Encores: School / Crime of the Century
- 1985: Aliens in Texas – Dallas '85
  - Still in Love / Bloody Well Right / From Now On / Rudy / Cannonball / Asylum / Ain't Nobody But Me / Goodbye Stranger / I Just Wanna Make Love to You / Better Days / Crime of the Century
- 1988: Madrid 1988
  - You Started Laughing / It's Alright / Not The Moment / Ain't Nobody But Me / Better Days / Bloody Well Right / Cannonball / Breakfast in America / From Now On / Free as a Bird / An Awful Thing to Waste / Asylum / Rudy / Where I Stand / Oh Darling / Just Another Nervous Wreck / The Logical Song / Goodbye Stranger / Encores: School / Crime of the Century
- 2002: One More for the Road Tour – Mannheim
  - School / Slow Motion / Over You / Bloody Well Right / Tenth Avenue Breakdown / Cannonball / Sooner or Later / Free as a Bird / Downstream / Asylum / Give a Little Bit / From Now On / Take the Long Way Home / Another Man's Woman / The Logical Song / Goodbye Stranger / Encores: Broken Hearted / Rudy / Crime of the Century
- 2010: 70-10 Tour
  - You Started Laughing / Gone Hollywood / Put on Your Old Brown Shoes / Ain't Nobody But Me / Breakfast in America / Cannonball / Poor Boy / From Now On / Give A Little Bit / Downstream / Asylum (occasionally) / Rudy / It's Raining Again / Another Man's Woman / Take the Long Way Home / Bloody Well Right / The Logical Song / Goodbye Stranger / Encores: Don't You Lie to Me (occasionally) / School / Dreamer / Crime of the Century
