= List of songs recorded by Supertramp =

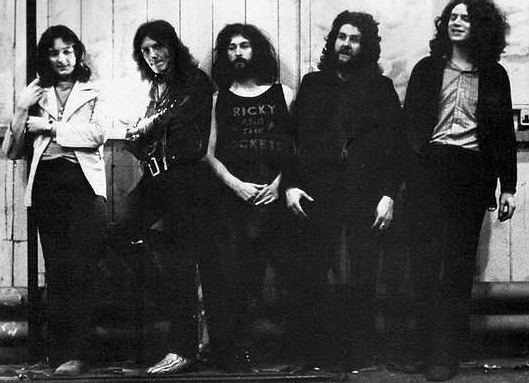
Supertramp's lineup in 1971 From left: Roger Hodgson, Frank Farrell, Rick Davies, Kevin Currie, Dave Winthrop.

The British rock band Supertramp recorded over 100 songs from 1970 to 2002. They were one of the most popular British bands in the 70s and 80s, known for their success with progressive rock.

== Songs ==
Key
‡	Indicates a song released as a single

Name of song, writer(s), lead vocal(s), original release, and year of release
Song	Writer(s) (Note: All Supertramp releases from Crime of the Century (1974) to ...Famous Last Words... (1982) are credited to both Rick Davies and Roger Hodgson. However the actual writers of each song differ from what is credited on the albums.)	Lead vocal(s)	Original release	Year	Ref.
"A Soapbox Opera"	Roger Hodgson	Roger Hodgson	Crisis? What Crisis?	1975	
"A Sting in the Tail"	Rick Davies	Rick Davies	Slow Motion	2002	
"Ain't Nobody but Me" ‡	Rick Davies	Rick Davies	Crisis? What Crisis?	1975	
"An Awful Thing to Waste"	Rick Davies	Rick Davies	Free as a Bird	1987	
"And I Am Not Like Other Birds of Prey" (Note: "Aubade" and "And I Am Not Like Other Birds of Prey" are credited as different songs on the 1970 UK release of Supertramp, while on the 1977 US release they are merged into "Aubade and I Am Not Like Other Birds of Prey".)	Rick Davies; Roger Hodgson; Richard Palmer	Roger Hodgson	Supertramp	1970	
"And the Light"	Rick Davies	Rick Davies	Some Things Never Change	1997	
"Another Man's Woman"	Rick Davies	Rick Davies	Crisis? What Crisis?	1975	
"Aries"	Rick Davies; Roger Hodgson	Roger Hodgson	Indelibly Stamped	1971	
"Asylum"	Rick Davies	Rick Davies	Crime of the Century	1974	
"Aubade"	Rick Davies; Roger Hodgson; Richard Palmer	Roger Hodgson	Supertramp	1970	
"Babaji" ‡	Roger Hodgson	Roger Hodgson	Even in the Quietest Moments...	1977	
"Bee in Your Bonnet"	Rick Davies	Rick Davies	Slow Motion	2002	
"Better Days" ‡	Rick Davies	Rick Davies	Brother Where You Bound	1985	
"Bloody Well Right" ‡	Rick Davies	Rick Davies	Crime of the Century	1974	
"Bonnie"	Rick Davies	Rick Davies	...Famous Last Words...	1982	
"Breakfast in America" ‡	Roger Hodgson	Roger Hodgson	Breakfast in America	1979	
"Broken Hearted"	Rick Davies	Rick Davies	Slow Motion	2002	
"Brother Where You Bound"	Rick Davies	Rick Davies	Brother Where You Bound	1985	
"C'est le bon"	Roger Hodgson	Roger Hodgson	...Famous Last Words...	1982	
"C'est What?"	Rick Davies	Rick Davies	Some Things Never Change	1997	
"Cannonball" ‡	Rick Davies	Rick Davies	Brother Where You Bound	1985	
"Casual Conversations"	Rick Davies	Rick Davies	Breakfast in America	1979	
"Child of Vision"	Roger Hodgson	Roger Hodgson; Rick Davies; John Helliwell	Breakfast in America	1979	
"Coming Home To See You"	Rick Davies; Roger Hodgson	Rick Davies	Indelibly Stamped	1971	
"Crazy" ‡	Roger Hodgson	Roger Hodgson	...Famous Last Words...	1982	
"Crime of the Century"	Rick Davies	Rick Davies	Crime of the Century	1974	
"Dead Man's Blues"	Rick Davies	Rick Davies	Slow Motion	2002	
"Don't Leave Me Now" ‡	Roger Hodgson	Roger Hodgson	...Famous Last Words...	1982	
"Downstream"	Rick Davies	Rick Davies	Even in the Quietest Moments...	1977	
"Dreamer" ‡	Roger Hodgson	Roger Hodgson	Crime of the Century	1974	
"Easy Does It"	Roger Hodgson	Roger Hodgson	Crisis? What Crisis?	1975	
"Even in the Quietest Moments"	Roger Hodgson	Roger Hodgson	Even in the Quietest Moments...	1977	
"Ever Open Door"	Rick Davies	Rick Davies	Brother Where You Bound	1985	
"Fool's Overture"	Roger Hodgson	Roger Hodgson	Even in the Quietest Moments...	1977	
"Forever"	Rick Davies; Roger Hodgson	Rick Davies	Indelibly Stamped	1971	
"Free as a Bird" ‡	Rick Davies	Rick Davies	Free as a Bird	1987	
"Friend in Need"	Rick Davies; Roger Hodgson	Rick Davies	Indelibly Stamped	1971	
"From Now On"	Rick Davies	Rick Davies	Even in the Quietest Moments...	1977	
"Get Your Act Together"	Rick Davies	Rick Davies	Some Things Never Change	1997	
"Give Me a Chance"	Rick Davies; Mark Hart	Rick Davies	Some Things Never Change	1997	
"Give a Little Bit" ‡	Roger Hodgson	Roger Hodgson	Even in the Quietest Moments...	1977	
"Goldrush" (Note: "Goldrush" was originally written and performed live by Supertramp in the early 70s, but a studio version wasn't officially released until Slow Motion.)	Rick Davies; Richard Palmer	Rick Davies	Slow Motion	2002	
"Gone Hollywood"	Rick Davies	Rick Davies; Roger Hodgson	Breakfast in America	1979	
"Goodbye Stranger" ‡	Rick Davies	Rick Davies	Breakfast in America	1979	
"Help Me Down That Road"	Rick Davies	Rick Davies	Some Things Never Change	1997	
"Hide in Your Shell"	Roger Hodgson	Roger Hodgson	Crime of the Century	1974	
"Home Again"	Rick Davies; Roger Hodgson; Richard Palmer	Roger Hodgson	Supertramp	1970	
"I'm Beggin' You" ‡	Rick Davies	Rick Davies	Free as a Bird	1987	
"If Everyone Was Listening"	Roger Hodgson	Roger Hodgson	Crime of the Century	1974	
"It Doesn't Matter"	Rick Davies	Rick Davies	Free as a Bird	1987	
"It's a Hard World"	Rick Davies	Rick Davies	Some Things Never Change	1997	
"It's a Long Road"	Rick Davies; Roger Hodgson; Richard Palmer	Roger Hodgson	Supertramp	1970	
"It's Alright" ‡	Rick Davies	Rick Davies	Free as a Bird	1987	
"It's Raining Again" ‡	Roger Hodgson	Roger Hodgson	...Famous Last Words...	1982	
"Just a Normal Day"	Rick Davies; Roger Hodgson	Rick Davies	Crisis? What Crisis?	1975	
"Just Another Nervous Wreck"	Rick Davies	Rick Davies	Breakfast in America	1979	
"Know Who You Are"	Roger Hodgson	Roger Hodgson	...Famous Last Words...	1982	
"Lady" ‡	Roger Hodgson	Roger Hodgson	Crisis? What Crisis?	1975	
"Land Ho" ‡	Roger Hodgson	Roger Hodgson	Non-album single	1974	
"Listen To Me Please" ‡	Rick Davies	Rick Davies	Some Things Never Change	1997	
"Little By Little"	Rick Davies	Rick Davies	Slow Motion	2002	
"Live to Love You"	Rick Davies; Mark Hart	Rick Davies	Some Things Never Change	1997	
"Lord Is It Mine"	Roger Hodgson	Roger Hodgson	Breakfast in America	1979	
"Lover Boy"	Rick Davies	Rick Davies	Even in the Quietest Moments...	1977	
"Maybe I'm a Beggar"	Rick Davies; Roger Hodgson; Richard Palmer	Richard Palmer; Roger Hodgson	Supertramp	1970	
"My Kind of Lady" ‡	Rick Davies	Rick Davies	...Famous Last Words...	1982	
"No Inbetween"	Rick Davies	Rick Davies	Brother Where You Bound	1985	
"Not the Moment"	Rick Davies	Rick Davies	Free as a Bird	1987	
"Nothing to Show"	Rick Davies; Roger Hodgson; Richard Palmer	Roger Hodgson; Rick Davies	Supertramp	1970	
"Oh Darling"	Rick Davies	Rick Davies	Breakfast in America	1979	
"Over You"	Rick Davies	Rick Davies	Slow Motion	2002	
"Poor Boy"	Rick Davies	Rick Davies	Crisis? What Crisis?	1975	
"Potter"	Rick Davies; Roger Hodgson	Dave Winthrop	Indelibly Stamped	1971	
"Put On Your Old Brown Shoes"	Rick Davies	Rick Davies	...Famous Last Words...	1982	
"Remember"	Rick Davies; Roger Hodgson	Rick Davies	Indelibly Stamped	1971	
"Rosie Had Everything Planned"	Roger Hodgson; Frank Farrell	Roger Hodgson	Indelibly Stamped	1971	
"Rudy"	Rick Davies	Rick Davies	Crime of the Century	1974	
"School" (Note: Re-released as a single in 1989.) ‡	Rick Davies; Roger Hodgson	Roger Hodgson	Crime of the Century	1974	
"Shadow Song"	Rick Davies; Roger Hodgson; Richard Palmer	Rick Davies; Roger Hodgson	Supertramp	1970	
"Sister Moonshine"	Roger Hodgson	Roger Hodgson	Crisis? What Crisis?	1975	
"Slow Motion" ‡	Rick Davies	Rick Davies	Slow Motion	2002	
"Some Things Never Change"	Rick Davies	Rick Davies	Some Things Never Change	1997	
"Sooner or Later"	Rick Davies; Mark Hart	Rick Davies	Some Things Never Change	1997	
"Still in Love" ‡	Rick Davies	Rick Davies	Brother Where You Bound	1985	
"Summer Romance"	Rick Davies	Rick Davies	B-side to "Land Ho"	1974	
"Surely (reprise)"	Rick Davies; Roger Hodgson; Richard Palmer	Roger Hodgson	Supertramp	1970	
"Surely"	Rick Davies; Roger Hodgson; Richard Palmer	Roger Hodgson	Supertramp	1970	
"Take the Long Way Home" ‡	Roger Hodgson	Roger Hodgson	Breakfast in America	1979	
"Tenth Avenue Breakdown"	Rick Davies	Rick Davies	Slow Motion	2002	
"The Logical Song" ‡	Roger Hodgson	Roger Hodgson	Breakfast in America	1979	
"The Meaning"	Roger Hodgson	Roger Hodgson	Crisis? What Crisis?	1975	
"Thing for You"	Rick Davies	Rick Davies	Free as a Bird	1987	
"Times Have Changed"	Rick Davies; Roger Hodgson	Rick Davies	Indelibly Stamped	1971	
"Travelled"	Rick Davies; Roger Hodgson	Roger Hodgson	Indelibly Stamped	1971	
"Try Again"	Rick Davies; Roger Hodgson; Richard Palmer	Roger Hodgson; Richard Palmer	Supertramp	1970	
"Two of Us"	Roger Hodgson	Roger Hodgson	Crisis? What Crisis?	1975	
"Waiting So Long"	Rick Davies	Rick Davies	...Famous Last Words...	1982	
"Where I Stand"	Rick Davies; Mark Hart	Rick Davies	Free as a Bird	1987	
"Where There's a Will"	Rick Davies	Rick Davies	Some Things Never Change	1997	
"Words Unspoken"	Rick Davies; Roger Hodgson; Richard Palmer	Roger Hodgson	Supertramp	1970	
"You Never Can Tell with Friends"	Rick Davies	Rick Davies	Free as a Bird	1987	
"You Started Laughing When I Held You In My Arms" (Note: Referred to as "You Started Laughing" beginning with the live album Paris.)	Rick Davies	Rick Davies	B-side to "Lady"	1975	
"You Win, I Lose" ‡	Rick Davies	Rick Davies	Some Things Never Change	1997	
"Your Poppa Don't Mind" ‡	Rick Davies; Roger Hodgson	Rick Davies	Indelibly Stamped	1971	
