= The Very Best of Supertramp =

Greatest hits album by Supertramp
- Released: June 1990
- Recorded: 1974–1985
- Genre: Pop, progressive rock
- Length: 78:57
- Label: A&M
- Producer: Peter Henderson, Ken Scott, Supertramp, David Kershenbaum

Supertramp chronology
Live '88 (1988)	The Very Best of Supertramp (1990)	The Very Best of Supertramp 2 (1992)

The Very Best of Supertramp is a greatest hits album by the British rock band Supertramp, originally released by A&M Records in June 1990.

== Overview ==
The compilation is basically a new version of the Autobiography/Classics Vol. 9 CD with the additional song "School" inserted as track 1. Furthermore, all songs are featured in their full-length album versions. The cover depicts the grate from the cover of Crime of the Century, the hand carrying the glass from the cover of Breakfast in America and the orange umbrella from Crisis? What Crisis?. Tracks from their self-titled album Supertramp and Indelibly Stamped were not included.

== Reception ==
Professional ratings
Review scores
Source	Rating
AllMusic	4.5/5 stars
The Rolling Stone Album Guide	3/5 stars

In their retrospective review, AllMusic noted that effectively compiling Supertramp's work is impossible since the group is so album-oriented. However, they offered a relative recommendation for The Very Best of Supertramp, saying that "it flows very smoothly" and is "the closest thing to a definitive overview of the '70s pop-prog group."

== Alternative version ==
A Dutch release, also titled The Very Best of Supertramp, was issued in late 1989, featuring the same tracks but in a different order and a different sleeve. It was compiled by Dutch compilation label Arcade, although it was later re-issued on the A&M label. The album was a major success in the Dutch chart, spending nine weeks at number one and 70 weeks in total. Given its success, A&M did not officially release the alternative The Very Best of Supertramp in the Netherlands, although it has now replaced the Arcade version.

== Track listing ==
All tracks are written by Roger Hodgson and Rick Davies, except where noted.

No.	Title	Original album	Length
1.	"School" (Lead vocals: Roger Hodgson & Rick Davies. Producer: Ken Scott & Supertramp)	Crime of the Century, (1974)	5:36
2.	"Goodbye Stranger" (Lead vocals: Rick Davies & Rodger Hodgson. Producer: Supertramp & Peter Henderson)	Breakfast in America, (1979)	5:48
3.	"The Logical Song" (Lead vocals: Roger Hodgson. Producer: Supertramp & Peter Henderson)	Breakfast in America	4:10
4.	"Bloody Well Right" (Lead vocals: Rick Davies. Producer: Ken Scott & Supertramp)	Crime of the Century	4:33
5.	"Breakfast in America" (Lead vocals: Roger Hodgson. Producer: Supertramp & Peter Henderson)	Breakfast in America	2:40
6.	"Rudy" (Lead vocals: Rick Davies & Roger Hodgson. Producer: Ken Scott & Supertramp)	Crime of the Century	7:19
7.	"Take the Long Way Home" (Lead vocals: Roger Hodgson. Producer: Supertramp & Peter Henderson)	Breakfast in America	5:08
8.	"Crime of the Century" (Lead vocals: Rick Davies. Producer: Ken Scott & Supertramp)	Crime of the Century	5:32
9.	"Dreamer" (Lead vocals: Roger Hodgson & Rick Davies. Producer: Ken Scott & Supertramp)	Crime of the Century	3:31
10.	"Ain't Nobody But Me" (Lead vocals: Rick Davies. Producer: Ken Scott & Supertramp)	Crisis? What Crisis?, (1975)	5:10
11.	"Hide in Your Shell" (Lead vocals: Roger Hodgson. Producer: Ken Scott & Supertramp)	Crime of the Century	6:50
12.	"From Now On" (Lead vocals: Rick Davies. Producer: Supertramp)	Even in the Quietest Moments..., (1977)	6:19
13.	"Give a Little Bit" (Lead vocals: Roger Hodgson. Producer: Supertramp)	Even in the Quietest Moments...	4:09
14.	"It's Raining Again" (Lead vocals: Roger Hodgson. Producer: Supertramp, Russel Pope & Peter Henderson)	...Famous Last Words..., (1982)	4:27
15.	"Cannonball" (Lead vocals: Rick Davies. Producer: David Kershenbaum & Supertramp. Written by Rick Davies.)	Brother Where You Bound, (1985)	7:38

The cassette version also included "Even in the Quietest Moments", "Sister Moonshine" and "Free as a Bird".

== Personnel ==
=== Supertramp ===
- Rick Davies – vocals, keyboard, harmonica, melodica
- Roger Hodgson – vocals, keyboard, guitar (except on "Cannonball")
- Dougie Thomson – bass guitar
- John Anthony Helliwell – saxophone, clarinets, vocals
- Bob Siebenberg – drums, percussion

=== Other performers ===
- Christine Helliwell – backing vocals on "Hide in Your Shell"
- Vicky Siebenberg – backing vocals on "Hide in Your Shell"
- Scott Gorham – backing vocals on "Hide in Your Shell"
- Jake Beddoe – saw on "Hide in Your Shell"
- Ken Scott – water gong on "Crime of the Century"
- Slyde Hyde – trombone, tuba on "Breakfast in America"
- Marty Walsh – guitar on "Cannonball"
- Doug Wintz – trombone on "Cannonball"

=== Production ===
Original release:

- Producers: Ken Scott and Supertramp
- Engineers: Ken Scott, John Jansen, Peter Henderson, Russel Pope, Norman Hall
- String arrangements: Richard Hewson
- Cover Illustration: Greg Wray
- Art direction and design: Norman Moore

== Charts ==
=== Weekly charts ===
Weekly chart performance for The Very Best of Supertramp
Chart (1990–2017)	Peak position
Australian Albums (ARIA)	37
Austrian Albums (Ö3 Austria)	27
Belgian Albums (Ultratop Flanders)	34
Belgian Albums (Ultratop Wallonia)	150
Canadian Albums (Billboard)	59
Dutch Albums (Album Top 100)	40
German Albums (Offizielle Top 100)	6
French Albums (SNEP)	123
Italian Albums (FIMI)	35
New Zealand Albums (RMNZ)	1
Norwegian Albums (VG-lista)	5
Portuguese Albums (AFP)	1
Scottish Albums (OCC)	13
Spanish Albums (Promusicae)	79
Swedish Albums (Sverigetopplistan)	5
Swiss Albums (Schweizer Hitparade)	7
UK Albums (OCC)	8

=== Year-end charts ===
Year-end chart performance for The Very Best of Supertramp
Chart	Position
European Albums (Music & Media) 1990	97
New Zealand Albums (RMNZ) 1992	33

== Certifications and sales ==
Certifications and sales for The Very Best of Supertramp
Region	Certification	Certified units/sales
Argentina (CAPIF)	Platinum	60,000^{^}
Australia (ARIA)	Gold	35,000^{^}
Austria (IFPI Austria)	Gold	25,000^{*}
Canada (Music Canada)	2× Platinum	200,000^{^}
France (SNEP)	2× Platinum	600,000^{*}
Germany (BVMI)	Gold	250,000^{^}
Italy	—	150,000
New Zealand (RMNZ)	Platinum	15,000^{^}
Spain (Promusicae)	Platinum	100,000^{^}
Sweden (GLF)	Gold	50,000^{^}
Switzerland (IFPI Switzerland)	2× Platinum	100,000^{^}
United Kingdom (BPI)	Platinum	300,000^{*}
^{*} Sales figures based on certification alone.^{^} Shipments figures based on certification alone.
