= Retrospectacle – The Supertramp Anthology =

2005 compilation album by Supertramp

Compilation album by Supertramp
- Released: 18 October 2005
- Recorded: 1970–2002
- Genre: Progressive rock, pop rock, art rock
- Length: 154:08
- Label: A&M
- Producer: Supertramp, Ken Scott, Peter Henderson, David Kershenbaum, Rick Davies, Jack Douglas, Mark Hart, Jay Messina

Supertramp chronology
Slow Motion (2002)	Retrospectacle – The Supertramp Anthology (2005)	70-10 Tour (2010)

Professional ratings
Review scores
Source	Rating
Allmusic	4.5/5 stars

Retrospectacle – The Supertramp Anthology is the first comprehensive compilation album by the British rock band Supertramp, released in October 2005.

== Overview ==
As Supertramp's first career retrospective, Retrospectacle contains a compilation of the most popular songs, live tracks and favourite album tracks from all of their albums from Supertramp to Slow Motion, including the live albums Paris and It Was the Best of Times. It was released as either a single disc or a double album.

Also, Retrospectacle marks the first appearance on an album of the single "Land Ho" and its B-side "Summer Romance". The version of "Land Ho" used on the compilation is the 1975 remix which the band intended to use on Crisis? What Crisis? but left off at the last minute, while "Summer Romance" is the original mix from the single. "Land Ho" was later rerecorded by Roger Hodgson for his 1987 solo album Hai Hai (with new lyrics).

Classic Rock ranked Retrospectacle the 12th greatest compilation album of 2005.

== Track listing ==
All songs are written by Rick Davies and Roger Hodgson, except where noted.

=== Single Disc Edition ===
No.	Title	Writer(s)	Place of Origin	Length
1.	"Surely" (Edited version)	Davies, Hodgson, Richard Palmer	Supertramp, 1970	1:10
2.	"Land Ho" (Remix)		Non-album single, 1974	3:54
3.	"School"		Crime of the Century, 1974	5:34
4.	"Bloody Well Right"		Crime of the Century	4:32
5.	"Dreamer"		Crime of the Century	3:31
6.	"Crime of the Century"		Crime of the Century	5:34
7.	"Ain't Nobody But Me"		Crisis? What Crisis?, 1975	5:10
8.	"Give a Little Bit"		Even in the Quietest Moments..., 1977	4:08
9.	"From Now On"		Even in the Quietest Moments...	6:20
10.	"The Logical Song"		Breakfast in America, 1979	4:08
11.	"Goodbye Stranger"		Breakfast in America	5:48
12.	"Breakfast in America"		Breakfast in America	2:39
13.	"Take the Long Way Home"		Breakfast in America	5:00
14.	"It's Raining Again"		...Famous Last Words..., 1982	4:24
15.	"Cannonball"	Davies	Brother Where You Bound, 1985	7:39
16.	"Free as a Bird"	Davies	Free as a Bird, 1987	4:22
17.	"You Win, I Lose"	Davies	Some Things Never Change, 1997	4:35

=== Two Disc Edition ===
==== Disc one ====
No.	Title	Writer(s)	Place of Origin	Length
1.	"Surely" (Edited version)	Davies, Hodgson, Palmer	Supertramp, 1970	1:03
2.	"Your Poppa Don't Mind"		Indelibly Stamped, 1971	2:59
3.	"Land Ho" (Remix)		Non-album single, 1974	3:54
4.	"Summer Romance"		B-side to "Land Ho", 1974	2:51
5.	"School"		Crime of the Century, 1974	5:34
6.	"Bloody Well Right"		Crime of the Century	4:32
7.	"Dreamer"		Crime of the Century	3:31
8.	"Rudy"		Crime of the Century	7:18
9.	"Crime of the Century"		Crime of the Century	5:34
10.	"Sister Moonshine"		Crisis? What Crisis?, 1975	5:18
11.	"Ain't Nobody But Me"		Crisis? What Crisis?	5:10
12.	"Lady"		Crisis? What Crisis?	5:23
13.	"Two of Us"		Crisis? What Crisis?	3:26
14.	"Give a Little Bit"		Even in the Quietest Moments..., 1977	4:08
15.	"Downstream"		Even in the Quietest Moments...	4:02
16.	"Even in the Quietest Moments"		Even in the Quietest Moments...	6:28
17.	"From Now On"		Even in the Quietest Moments...	6:20

==== Disc two ====
No.	Title	Writer(s)	Place of Origin	Length
1.	"Gone Hollywood"		Breakfast in America, 1979	5:20
2.	"The Logical Song"		Breakfast in America	4:08
3.	"Goodbye Stranger"		Breakfast in America	5:48
4.	"Breakfast in America"		Breakfast in America	2:39
5.	"Oh Darling"		Breakfast in America	3:49
6.	"Take the Long Way Home"		Breakfast in America	5:00
7.	"You Started Laughing" (Live)		Paris, 1980; originally the B-side to the "Lady" single, 1975	4:02
8.	"It's Raining Again"		...Famous Last Words..., 1982	4:24
9.	"My Kind of Lady"		...Famous Last Words...	5:14
10.	"Don't Leave Me Now"		...Famous Last Words...	6:20
11.	"Cannonball"	Davies	Brother Where You Bound, 1985	7:39
12.	"Free as a Bird"	Davies	Free as a Bird, 1987	4:21
13.	"You Win, I Lose"	Davies	Some Things Never Change, 1997	4:33
14.	"Another Man's Woman" (Live)		It Was the Best of Times, 1999; originally from Crisis? What Crisis?	9:35
15.	"Over You" (Edited version)	Davies	Slow Motion, 2002	3:31

== Production ==
- Compilation producers: Rick Davies, Bill Levenson
- Producers: Supertramp, Ken Scott, Peter Henderson, Jay Messina, Jack Douglas, David Kershenbaum and Rick Davies.
- Mastering: Greg Calbi, Jay Messina
- Art Direction: Richard Frankel, Vartan.
- Cover Art: Bruno Budrovic

== Charts ==
=== Weekly charts ===
Chart (2005)	Peak position
Austrian Albums (Ö3 Austria)	33
Belgian Albums (Ultratop Flanders)	39
Belgian Albums (Ultratop Wallonia)	29
Dutch Albums (Album Top 100)	22
French Compilations Albums (SNEP)	10
German Albums (Offizielle Top 100)	47
Italian Albums (FIMI)	65
Norwegian Albums (VG-lista)	6
Portuguese Albums (AFP)	25
Scottish Albums (OCC)	11
Spanish Albums (PROMUSICAE)	13
Swiss Albums (Schweizer Hitparade)	11
UK Albums (OCC)	9

Chart (2006)	Peak position
Swedish Albums (Sverigetopplistan)	3

Chart (2015)	Peak position
French Albums (SNEP)	172

=== Year-end charts ===
Chart (2005)	Position
UK Albums (OCC)	41
Chart (2006)	Position
Swedish Albums (Sverigetopplistan)	73

== Certifications ==
Region	Certification	Certified units/sales
New Zealand (RMNZ)	Gold	7,500^{^}
Spain (PROMUSICAE)	Platinum	100,000^{^}
United Kingdom (BPI)	2× Platinum	600,000^{‡}
^{^} Shipments figures based on certification alone.^{‡} Sales+streaming figures based on certification alone.
