= The Autobiography of Supertramp =

Greatest hits album by Supertramp
- Released: 10 October 1986
- Recorded: 1974–1985
- Genres: Progressive rock, pop rock, art rock
- Length: 47:10
- Label: A&M
- Producers: Ken Scott, Peter Henderson, David Kershenbaum, Supertramp

Supertramp chronology
Brother Where You Bound (1985)	The Autobiography of Supertramp (1986)	Free as a Bird (1987)

Classics, Volume 9
- US cover

The Autobiography of Supertramp is the first compilation album by the British rock band Supertramp, released in 1986.

The collection features the most popular songs from the albums Crime of the Century, Even in the Quietest Moments, Breakfast in America, ...Famous Last Words..., and Brother Where You Bound. The CD version adds three tracks, including a song from Crisis? What Crisis?.

The cover art shows a suit-wearing, faceless man seated in a train carriage reading a book with his own face on the cover. The view from the train window shows the platform with stylised versions of the cover art from three of Supertramp's albums. The title is a nod to the book The Autobiography Of A Super-Tramp by W.H. Davies, from which the band took its name.

The album was also released in the US as Classics, Volume 9, part of A&M's 25th Anniversary series (1987).

The album was re-released as The Very Best of Supertramp in 1990 with "School" from Crime of the Century added as the first track.

== Reception ==
Professional ratings
Review scores
Source	Rating
AllMusic	4.5/5 stars
The Rolling Stone Album Guide	3/5 stars

AllMusic's retrospective review commented that The Very Best of Supertramp is a superior compilation with its choice of tracks.

== Track listing ==
All songs written by Rick Davies and Roger Hodgson, except where noted.

=== Original release ===
==== LP album ====
1. "Goodbye Stranger" (Single edit, from Breakfast in America, 1979) – 4:25
2. "The Logical Song" (Single edit, from Breakfast in America) – 3:45
3. "Bloody Well Right" (Single edit, from Crime of the Century, 1974) – 4:16
4. "Breakfast in America" (from Breakfast in America) – 2:37
5. "Take the Long Way Home" (Single edit, from Breakfast in America) – 4:03
6. "Crime of the Century" (Early fade-out, from Crime of the Century)– 5:20
7. "Dreamer" (from Crime of the Century) – 3:19
8. "From Now On" (from Even in the Quietest Moments..., 1977) – 6:10
9. "Give a Little Bit" (from Even in the Quietest Moments...) – 4:03
10. "It's Raining Again" (from ...Famous Last Words..., 1982) – 4:25
11. "Cannonball" (Single edit, from Brother Where You Bound, 1985) (Davies) – 4:47

==== Compact disc (Issued as A&M Classics, Volume 9 in the U.S. and Canada) ====
1. "Goodbye Stranger" (Single edit) – 4:29
2. "The Logical Song" (Single edit) – 3:47
3. "Bloody Well Right" (Single edit) – 4:17
4. "Breakfast in America" – 2:38
5. "Rudy" (from Crime of the Century) – 7:17
6. "Take the Long Way Home" (Single edit) – 4:06
7. "Crime of the Century" – 5:32
8. "Dreamer" – 3:31
9. "Ain't Nobody But Me" (from Crisis? What Crisis?, 1975) – 5:07
10. "Hide in Your Shell" (from Crime of the Century) – 6:47
11. "From Now On" – 6:10
12. "Give a Little Bit" – 4:08
13. "It's Raining Again" – 4:23
14. "Cannonball" (Single edit) (Davies) – 4:51

== Personnel ==
Supertramp

- Rick Davies – keyboard, harmonica, vocals
- Roger Hodgson (except on "Cannonball") – guitar, keyboards, vocals
- Dougie Thomson – bass
- John Helliwell – saxophone, woodwinds, keyboards, glockenspiel
- Bob Siebenberg – drums, percussion

Additional musicians

- Slyde Hyde – trombone on "Breakfast in America"
- Marty Walsh – guitar on "Cannonball"
- Doug Wintz – trombone on "Cannonball"

== Production ==
- Producers: Ken Scott, Peter Henderson, David Kershenbaum and Supertramp
- Mastering: Bernie Grundman, Norman Hall - Bernie Grundman Mastering, Inc.
- Cover design: Richard Frankel, Norman Moore
- Photography: Ron Slenzak
- Poster illustrations: Holly Hollington

== Charts ==
=== Weekly charts ===
Chart (1986–87)	Peak position
Canada Top Albums/CDs (RPM)	12
Dutch Albums (Album Top 100)	61
German Albums (Offizielle Top 100)	45
New Zealand Albums (RMNZ)	7
UK Albums (Official Charts)	9

=== Year-end charts ===
Chart (1987)	Position
New Zealand Albums (RMNZ)	49

== Certifications and sales ==
Region	Certification	Certified units/sales
Brazil	—	250,000
New Zealand (RMNZ)	Platinum	15,000^{^}
Switzerland (IFPI Switzerland)	Gold	25,000^{^}
United Kingdom (BPI)	Platinum	300,000^{^}
^{^} Shipments figures based on certification alone.
