= The Very Best of Supertramp 2 =

Greatest hits album by Supertramp
- Released: November 1992
- Recorded: 1974–1987
- Genre: Progressive rock, pop, art rock
- Length: 76:27
- Label: A&M
- Producer: Peter Henderson, Ken Scott, Supertramp, Rick Davies

Supertramp chronology
| The Very Best of Supertramp (1990) | The Very Best of Supertramp 2 (1992) | Some Things Never Change (1997) |

The Very Best of Supertramp 2 is a best of album by the British rock band Supertramp, originally released by A&M Records in November 1992.

== Overview ==
This compilation features 13 tracks from their five "prime" albums (Crime of the Century, Crisis? What Crisis?, Even in the Quietest Moments..., Breakfast in America and ...Famous Last Words...) as well as the title track from their 1987 album Free as a Bird. The cover depicts the starry backdrop and grate from the cover of Crime of the Century, the hand carrying the glass from the cover of Breakfast in America, and the orange umbrella from Crisis? What Crisis?.

== Reception ==
Professional ratings
Review scores
| Source | Rating |
|---|---|
| AllMusic | 2.5/5 stars |

In his retrospective review, AllMusic's Jon O'Brien noted that this second collection contains less-familiar songs, including only five which had been released as singles, none of which were significant hits in the U.K. or U.S.

== Track listing ==
All tracks are written by Roger Hodgson and Rick Davies, except where noted.

| No. | Title | Original album | Length |
|---|---|---|---|
| 1. | "Lady" | Crisis? What Crisis?, (1975) | 5:24 |
| 2. | "Oh Darling" | Breakfast in America, (1979) | 4:01 |
| 3. | "Even in the Quietest Moments" | Even in the Quietest Moments..., (1977) | 6:39 |
| 4. | "Waiting So Long" | ...Famous Last Words..., (1982) | 6:32 |
| 5. | "Babaji" | Even in the Quietest Moments... | 4:49 |
| 6. | "Gone Hollywood" | Breakfast in America | 5:14 |
| 7. | "If Everyone Was Listening" | Crime of the Century, (1974) | 4:01 |
| 8. | "Just Another Nervous Wreck" | Breakfast in America | 4:22 |
| 9. | "Don't Leave Me Now" | ...Famous Last Words... | 6:25 |
| 10. | "My Kind of Lady" | ...Famous Last Words... | 5:12 |
| 11. | "A Soapbox Opera" | Crisis? What Crisis? | 4:50 |
| 12. | "Downstream" | Even in the Quietest Moments... | 4:00 |
| 13. | "Fool's Overture" | Even in the Quietest Moments... | 10:51 |
| 14. | "Free as a Bird" (Davies) | Free as a Bird, (1987) | 4:20 |

== Personnel ==
=== Supertramp ===
- Rick Davies – vocals, keyboards, piano, harmonica
- Roger Hodgson – vocals, guitar, keyboards, piano except on "Downstream" and "Free as a Bird"
- Dougie Thomson – bass
- John Anthony Helliwell – saxophones, clarinets, vocals
- Bob C. Benberg – drums, percussion

=== Other performers ===
- Claire Diament – backing vocals on "Don't Leave Me Now"
- Mark Hart – guitar and keyboards on "Free as a Bird"
- Marty Walsh – guitar on "Free as a Bird"
- Linda Foot – backing vocals on "Free as a Bird"
- Lise Miller – backing vocals on "Free as a Bird"
- Evan Rogers – backing vocals on "Free as a Bird"
- Karyn White – backing vocals on "Free as a Bird"

== Charts ==
| Chart (2025) | Peak position |
|---|---|
| Greek Albums (IFPI) | 47 |

== Certifications ==
| Region | Certification | Certified units/sales |
|---|---|---|
| France (SNEP) | Gold | 100,000^{*} |
| Switzerland (IFPI Switzerland) | Gold | 25,000^{^} |
^{*} Sales figures based on certification alone.^{^} Shipments figures based on certification alone.
