= Live '88 (Supertramp album) =

Live album by Supertramp
- Released: 28 October 1988
- Recorded: March – April 1988
- Genres: Progressive rock, pop rock, art rock
- Label: A&M
- Producers: Rick Davies, Tom Lord-Alge, Supertramp

Supertramp chronology
Free as a Bird (1987)	Live '88 (1988)	The Very Best of Supertramp (1990)

Professional ratings
Review scores
Source	Rating
The Encyclopedia of Popular Music	2/5 stars

Live '88 is the second live album by the British rock band Supertramp released in October 1988 on A&M Records. It was their last album to feature bassist Dougie Thomson in any capacity.

== Overview ==
Originally recorded on two track cassette direct from the sound board for Rick Davies' use, Live '88 features the 4-piece lineup of the group augmented by additional players including Mark Hart (later a permanent member of the group and a future member of Crowded House) playing guitar and singing songs originally sung by Roger Hodgson. Live '88 was initially not intended for a commercial release, but Davies was so pleased with the vibe of the performances he authorized A&M to put it out.

Live '88 was only available in print very briefly. The album features two cover songs, "Hoochie Coochie Man" by Willie Dixon and "Don't You Lie To Me (I Get Evil)". The rest of the album consists of performances from the band's last set list to promote Free as a Bird (1987), along with a handful of numbers from throughout their career.

The band went on hiatus shortly after this album's release. Live '88 has not returned to print, unlike most of the Supertramp discography, and there are no songs from this release represented on the Retrospectacle: The Supertramp Anthology release.

== Track listing ==
- All songs by Rick Davies/Roger Hodgson, except where noted.
  Lead vocals by Rick Davies, except tracks 5 and 10 lead vocals by Mark Hart.
1. "You Started Laughing" – 1:47
2. "It's Alright" (Rick Davies) – 5:31
3. "Not the Moment" (Davies) – 4:40
4. "Bloody Well Right" – 6:20
5. "Breakfast in America" 2:52
6. "From Now On" – 7:56
7. "Free as a Bird" (Davies) – 4:43
8. "Oh Darling" – 3:45
9. "Just Another Nervous Wreck" – 4:36
10. "The Logical Song" – 4:07
11. "I'm Your Hoochie Coochie Man" (Willie Dixon) – 4:32
12. "Don't You Lie to Me (I Get Evil)" (Hudson Whittaker) – 2:48
13. "Crime of the Century" – 6:42

Tracks 8, 9 and 10 recorded at Palacio de los Deportes, Madrid, Spain 24 March 1988

== Personnel ==
=== Supertramp ===
- Rick Davies – piano, keyboards, vocals
- John Helliwell – saxophone, keyboards, backing vocals
- Dougie Thomson – bass
- Bob Siebenberg – drums

=== Touring musicians ===
- Mark Hart – keyboards, guitar, vocals
- Marty Walsh – guitar, backing vocals
- Brad Cole – keyboards, saxophones, backing vocals
- Steve Reid – percussion

== Charts ==
Chart (1988)	Peak position
German Albums (Offizielle Top 100)	50
