= Brother Where You Bound (song) =

1985 song by Supertramp

Song by Supertramp

from the album Brother Where You Bound
- Released: 14 May 1985
- Recorded: 1984
- Genre: Progressive rock
- Length: 16:30
- Label: A&M
- Songwriter: Rick Davies
- Producers: David Kershenbaum, Supertramp

"Brother Where You Bound" is the title track of English rock band Supertramp's 1985 album of the same name. Written and sung by keyboardist Rick Davies, it is the longest song Supertramp recorded at over sixteen minutes.

The song had been around a few years prior to its release; it was rehearsed for the last album with the band's classic line-up, ...Famous Last Words..., but cut.

There were a lot of incredible songs that didn't get on the album. Rick has a 12-minute epic that's probably the best thing he's ever done. It was going to be on the album, but the whole experience was so unpleasant that he felt he didn't want to put his masterpiece on an album where the vibes were so bad during the sessions.

— Roger Hodgson, The Los Angeles Times (1983)

The introduction to the track features a reading from George Orwell's novel Nineteen Eighty-Four, fragments of spoken news reports, and the final lines from the nursery rhyme Oranges and Lemons. An excerpt from "The Internationale" can also be heard from minute 1:10. The introduction is followed by lyrics that speak about the Cold War that was happening at the time of the recording in 1984. A music video was also produced for the song, which was filmed in the derelict Pan-Pacific Auditorium, starring actor Chris Mulkey. The video was directed by Rene Daalder and aroused controversy due to its graphic violence.

This track features drummer Bob Siebenberg's then brother-in-law Scott Gorham of Thin Lizzy on rhythm guitar. The guitar solos throughout the track were performed by Pink Floyd guitarist David Gilmour who used his own mixing system where he controlled every sound that went from his guitar onto the album.

In a 2002 radio interview on Rockline, Davies explained how Gilmour got involved on the title cut: "I remember saying to the guys, 'We need to find somebody that can play a bit like Gilmour' for the guitar stuff, and I think it was someone at A&M – it might have been Jordan Harris or somebody, one of those guys – and he said, 'Well, I know David – maybe he would like to come over and do it,' and he sent him a demo and he decided he'd like to do it and he was very reasonable. Came over, brought all his gear and straight to the studio. It was a home studio, my studio, and we did it."

On the accompanying tour, Gilmour's parts were interpreted by Carl Verheyen. According to Marty Walsh, who also played guitar for the tour, "Rick and the boys went about auditioning an additional guitarist. The song 'Brother Where You Bound' featured a great solo by David Gilmour. They wanted to find someone who had great solo chops to cover that bit and others. They auditioned a lot of excellent guitar players including Buzz Feiten and my pal from the A&M demo days Kenny Lee Lewis. Eventually they settled on Carl Verheyen."

== Personnel ==
- Rick Davies: piano, keyboards, lead vocals
- John Helliwell: saxophones
- Bob Siebenberg: drums, percussion
- Dougie Thomson: bass
- Marty Walsh: lead guitar
- David Gilmour: electric guitar solos
- Scott Gorham: rhythm guitar
- Scott Page: flute
