= The Story So Far... (Supertramp album) =

Supertramp

Video by Supertramp
- Released: 1990
- Recorded: 1983–1990
- Genre: Progressive rock
- Label: A&M Records

Professional ratings
Review scores
Source	Rating
AllMusic	4.5/5 stars

The Story So Far... is a 1990 rockumentary by English rock band Supertramp, featuring interviews with the band members telling the story of the band, and concert footage from the 1983 world tour promoting ...Famous Last Words..., filmed in Toronto and Munich. Originally released by A&M Records on VHS in 1990, it received a DVD version in 2002 that featured some of the band's music videos as extras. The cover art is the same as the greatest hits compilation The Very Best of Supertramp.

== Track listing ==
All music is composed by Rick Davies and Roger Hodgson.

No.	Title	Length
1.	"Crazy"
2.	"Ain't Nobody But Me"
3.	"Breakfast In America"
4.	"Bloody Well Right"
5.	"Give a Little Bit"
6.	"From Now On"
7.	"The Logical Song"
8.	"Goodbye Stranger"
9.	"Dreamer"
10.	"School"
11.	"Crime Of The Century"

== Live line-up ==
- Roger Hodgson – lead vocals, backing vocals, lead guitar, 12-string guitar, grand piano, Wurlitzer, synthesizers, pump organ
- Rick Davies – vocals, backing vocals, grand piano, Wurlitzer, synthesizers, organ, harmonica
- John Helliwell – saxophones, clarinet, backing vocals
- Dougie Thomson – bass guitar, backing vocals
- Bob Siebenberg – drums
- Scott Page – saxophones, flute, guitars, backing vocals
- Fred Mandel – keyboards, guitars, backing vocals

== Certifications ==
Region	Certification	Certified units/sales
New Zealand (RMNZ)	Platinum	5,000^{^}
^{^} Shipments figures based on certification alone.
