= Free as a Bird (Supertramp song) =

Single by Supertramp

from the album Free as a Bird
- B-side: "Thing For You"
- Released: 22 December 1987 (US); 26 February 1988 (UK)
- Genre: Pop rock
- Length: 4:20
- Label: A&M
- Songwriter(s): Rick Davies
- Producer(s): Rick Davies, Supertramp

Supertramp singles chronology
"I'm Beggin' You" (1987)	"Free as a Bird" (1987)	"You Win, I Lose" (1997)

Music video
- "Free as a Bird" on YouTube

"Free as a Bird" is the title track from Supertramp's 1987 album of the same name. Released as a single at the end of that year, the song achieved only marginal commercial success.

== Overview ==
The music video for "Free as a Bird" was produced by Sue Pemberton and directed by Michael Patterson and Candace Reckenger.

Cash Box said that "Rick Davies sets an easy groove with his patented, bluesy keyboard style, and takes you to a gospel out-chorus."

In 1988 "Free as a Bird" was performed on the Dutch pop music television series, TopPop.

It is the only song from the album of the same name that survived the accompanying tour. Live recordings were released on Live '88 and It Was the Best of Times.

"Free as a Bird" also appears on Supertramp's 1992 best-of album The Very Best of Supertramp 2 and the later compilation Retrospectacle – The Supertramp Anthology.

== Track listing ==
7" vinyl, Cassette

1. "Free as a Bird" – 4:20
2. "Thing For You" – 3:59

== Personnel ==
According the Free as a Bird and The Very Best of Supertramp 2 liner notes.

- Rick Davies - vocals, keyboards, producer
- John Anthony Helliwell - saxophone
- Dougie Thomson - bass
- Bob C. Benberg - drums

Other personnel

- Supertramp – producer
- Mark Hart – vocals, guitar and keyboards
- Marty Walsh – guitar
- Linda Foot – backing vocals
- Lise Miller – backing vocals
- Evan Rogers – backing vocals
- Karyn White – backing vocals

== Charts ==
Chart (1988)	Peak position
Netherlands (Single Top 100)	95
UK Singles (OCC)	95
