= Don't You Lie to Me =

Blues song first recorded by Tampa Red in 1940

Single by Tampa Red
- B-side: "Anna Lou Blues"
- Released: 1940
- Recorded: Chicago, May 10, 1940
- Genre: Blues
- Length: 2:55
- Label: Bluebird
- Songwriter: Hudson Whittaker a.k.a. Tampa Red

"Don't You Lie to Me" (sometimes called "I Get Evil") is a song recorded by Tampa Red in 1940. It became popular with blues artists, leading it to become a blues standard. The song was also interpreted by rock and roll pioneers Fats Domino and Chuck Berry.

== Original song ==
"Don't You Lie to Me" was recorded by Tampa Red approximately midpoint in his prolific recording career, representing the transition from his earlier hokum recordings to his later early Chicago-blues combo style. This was the same period when he began playing the electric guitar and recorded his best-known blues classics, including "It Hurts Me Too", "Love with a Feeling", and "Anna Lou Blues", the B-side of "Don't You Lie to Me".

The song is a mid-tempo twelve-bar blues that features Tampa Red playing jazz-inflected single-note guitar fills behind his vocals. Blind John Davis provided the piano accompaniment with an unidentified bass player and, as a throwback to his earlier days, Red added a twelve-bar kazoo solo. Although many later versions are credited to other artists, they usually use some, if not most, of Tampa Red's lyrics:

There're two kind of people I just can't stand
And that's a lying woman and a sneakin' man
So don't you lie to me, don't you lie to me
Because it makes me mad, and I get evil as a man can be

== Recordings by other artists ==
Fats Domino recorded "Don't You Lie to Me" early in his career in 1951 (Imperial 5123). He used most of Tampa Red's lyrics and, although there is a full backing band, his trademark piano accompaniment dominates the recording. Domino received sole credit for the song, as did Chuck Berry when he recorded a rock and roll version for his 1961 album New Juke-Box Hits.

In 1962, Albert King recorded "Don't You Lie to Me" as "I Get Evil" (Bobbin 135), which was included on his first album The Big Blues. King's version uses an Afro-Cuban style rhythm, which he would later use for his 1967 hit "Crosscut Saw". Later, King with Stevie Ray Vaughan recorded it live for television in 1983, which is included on Albert King with Stevie Ray Vaughan in Session. In 1977, B.B. King recorded the song for the opening track on his King Size album. An AllMusic album review noted its "nice, rolling groove that King rides real easy". In 1992, Gary Moore recorded the song for his After Hours album.

Supertramp have released two versions of Don't You Lie To Me, on two of their live albums, Live 88 in 1988 and It Was The Best Of Times in 1997. It was a staple of late band leader Rick Davies' band, Ricky And The Rockets' set list.
