= The Story =

The Story may refer to:

== Groups ==
- The Story (American band), a 1989–1994 folk-rock duo
- The Story (British band), an English psychedelic folk duo formed in 2002

== Songs ==
- "The Story" (Brandi Carlile song), 2007
- "The Story" (Conan Gray song), 2020
- "The Story", by 30 Seconds to Mars from A Beautiful Lie, 2005

== Albums ==
- The Story (Brandi Carlile album), 2007
- The Story (Kang Daniel album) or the title song, 2022
- The Story (Runrig album) or the title song, 2016

== Films ==
- The Story (2001 film)

== Places ==
- The Story Museum, a museum in Oxford, England
- The Story museum, located in Mount Oswald in County Durham, England

== See also ==
- The Story of Us (disambiguation)
- The Story So Far (disambiguation)
