= I'm Beggin' You =

1987 single by Supertramp

Single by Supertramp

from the album Free as a Bird
- B-side: "No Inbetween"
- Released: 23 October 1987
- Genre: Pop
- Label: A&M
- Songwriter: Rick Davies
- Producers: Rick Davies, Supertramp

Supertramp singles chronology
"Better Days" (1985)	"I'm Beggin' You" (1987)	"Free as a Bird" (1988)

"I'm Beggin' You" is a 1987 single by British rock band Supertramp and one of their two entries into the dance charts. "I'm Beggin' You" reached number one on the U.S. Billboard Hot Dance Club Play for one week, early in 1988. Unlike previous releases, the single did not enter the Billboard Hot 100.

== Music video ==
The music video for "I'm Beggin' You" was directed by Zbigniew Rybczyński. The video was set in New York City. Appearing were the George Washington Bridge, Times Square, and at the end of the music video, the Brooklyn Bridge spanning the East River.

== Track listing ==
1. "I'm Beggin' You" (Rick Davies)
2. "No Inbetween" (Davies)

== Personnel ==
- Rick Davies – piano, keyboards, vocals
- Marty Walsh – guitar
- Dougie Thomson – bass guitar
- John Helliwell – saxophone
- Lee Thornburg – trumpet, brass
- Nick Lane – brass
- Scott Page – brass
- Lon Price – brass
- David Woodford – brass
- Bob Siebenberg – drums
- Linda Foot – background vocals
- Lise Miller – background vocals
- Evan Rogers – background vocals
- Karyn White – background vocals

== Charts ==
Chart (1987–1988)	Peak position
Australia (Kent Music Report)	70
Canada Top Singles (RPM)	73
France (IFOP)	68
Italy Airplay (Music & Media)	2
US Adult Contemporary (Billboard)	42
US Dance Club Songs (Billboard)	1
