= The Story So Far =

The Story So Far may refer to:

== Books ==
- The Story So Far (book), a 2003 book by Bhawana Somaaya

== Films ==
- The Story So Far (2001 film), a film about the band Sick of It All
- The Story So Far (2002 film), a documentary about the band New Found Glory

== Music ==
=== Albums ===
- The Story So Far (Divine album), a 1984 album
- The Story So Far (Bucks Fizz album), a 1988 compilation album
- The Story So Far (Keith Urban album), a 2012 compilation album
- The Story So Far (Mo-dettes album), a 1981 album
- The Story So Far... (Mostly Autumn album), a 2001 live album
- The Story So Far... (Supertramp album), a live album\documentary by Supertramp
- The Story So Far: The Very Best of Rod Stewart, a 2001 greatest hits album
- The Story So Far (Spunge album), a 2002 album
- The Story So Far... (Lúnasa album), a 2008 greatest hits album
- The Story So Far – The Best Of Def Leppard, a 2018 compilation album
- Moby (album), titled The Story So Far in the UK, 1992

=== Bands ===
- The Story So Far (band), a pop punk band from Walnut Creek, California
  - The Story So Far (The Story So Far album), the band's self-titled album

=== Songs ===
- "The Story So Far", a 1973 song by Roger Daltrey from the album Daltrey
- "The Story So Far", a song by New Found Glory from the 2002 album Sticks and Stones
- "The Story So Far", a song by Tygers of Pan Tang from the 1981 album Spellbound
- "The Story So Far", a 2003 single by Edyta Górniak
- "The Story So Far", a song by Flogging Molly from the 2008 album Float
