= My Kind of Lady =

1983 single by Supertramp

Single by Supertramp

from the album …Famous Last Words…
- B-side: "Know Who You Are"
- Released: January 1983
- Genre: Pop
- Length: 4:24 (single), 5:17 (album version)
- Label: A&M
- Songwriters: Rick Davies, Roger Hodgson
- Producers: Supertramp, Peter Henderson

Supertramp singles chronology
"It's Raining Again" (1982)	"My Kind of Lady" (1983)	"Cannonball" (1985)

Music video
- "My Kind of Lady" on YouTube

"My Kind of Lady" is a song by the British rock band Supertramp, released as the second single from the band's 1982 album …Famous Last Words…. The song is a 1950s-style mid-tempo love ballad; it peaked at #16 on the USA Billboard Adult Contemporary and #31 on the USA Billboard Pop Singles charts. The lead and backing vocals were all sung by Davies, who harmonizes with himself by switching between his natural voice and a falsetto vocal. The echo-treated and natural-sounding voice was sung in Davies' baritone. The falsetto passages were double-tracked and mixed with a phaser. Despite being released as a single, the track was not performed live.

The song's writing credits are given to Rick Davies and Roger Hodgson, members of the band, although as indicated on the album sleeve, it is a Davies composition. Like John Lennon and Paul McCartney, Davies and Hodgson shared writer's credits from 1974 until 1983, when Hodgson left Supertramp to pursue a solo career.

The song was the last single released during original member Hodgson's tenure.

== Critical reception ==
Cash Box predicted that the song would be successful based on the "minimal production, Rick Davies' trademark falsetto and a catchy sax solo." Billboard praised the song's "sense of fun" and said it is a throwback to 1956 with "chunky piano, bleating sax, and rhymes you can quote before you've heard them." Reviewing the single for Record Mirror, Mark Cooper said that the song was for "people with expensive Hi-Fi and no interest in music."

== Track listings ==
=== 7" vinyl single ===
Side one
No.	Title	Length
1.	"My Kind of Lady"	4:12

Side two
No.	Title	Length
1.	"Know Who You Are"	4:58

== Music video ==
The video for "My Kind of Lady" was directed by Kenny Ortega. The band depicted themselves as a 1950s doo-wop group and 50s rock band. To do so, the band members shaved off their trademark beards and moustaches. Because he showed up late for the shoot, Hodgson is not in the doo-wop sequences.

The video had two different endings. One was a black and white ending with the band playing and the other was in colour with a different angle of the band playing at the end.

== Charts ==
Chart (1983)	Peak position
German Singles Chart	74
US Billboard Hot 100	31
US Billboard Adult Contemporary	16

== Personnel ==
- Rick Davies – lead and backing vocals, piano
- Roger Hodgson – guitar
- Dougie Thomson – bass guitar
- John Helliwell – baritone saxophone, alto saxophone, synthesizers
- Bob Siebenberg – drums
