= Some Things Never Change =

Studio album by Supertramp
- Released: 24 March 1997
- Recorded: 1996
- Studios: Ocean Way, Hollywood; The Backyard, Encino
- Genres: Blues rock, progressive rock
- Length: 65:36 (11-track version); 70:03 (12-track version)
- Labels: EMI; Oxygen (US)
- Producers: Jack Douglas, Fred Mandel

Supertramp chronology
The Very Best of Supertramp 2 (1992)	Some Things Never Change (1997)	It Was the Best of Times (1999)

Singles from Some Things Never Change
- 1. "You Win, I Lose" Released: February 1997; 2. "Listen to Me Please" Released: April 1997; 3. "Sooner or Later" Released: 1997 (NL)

Some Things Never Change is the tenth album by the British rock band Supertramp, released in March 1997.

== Overview ==
Some Things Never Change represented a deliberate return to the band's earlier sound (before Free as a Bird), using more organic recording techniques than on their previous studio album. John Helliwell recounted that "we recorded the album in a way that Supertramp never had and that was by all going into the studio together and doing it as a much more live thing."

The album features the single "You Win, I Lose", which was a minor hit in Germany and also received considerable airplay in Canada. Two more singles were released commercially: "Listen To Me Please" and "Sooner or Later".

The song "Live to Love You" (which was also released as a promo single) features both the 'tackled' sound from the Coleco Electronic Quarterback handheld electronic game, as well as the Trouble "Pop-o-matic bubble" sounds from their 1979 hit "The Logical Song".

== Cover art ==
Rick Davies explained the concept behind the album cover: "It's something to tie in with the title. In England people have tea at four o'clock and it doesn't matter where they are or what sort of social plane they're on, they will have that tea."

== Reception ==
Professional ratings
Review scores
Source	Rating
AllMusic	2/5 stars
Encyclopedia of Popular Music	3/5 stars
The Rolling Stone Album Guide	1/5 stars

AllMusic commented that the album retains the same style and strong instrumental interplay from the band's glory years, but lacks the "ingratiatingly catchy melodies" of that era, making it of strong interest to the band's fans but much less to casual listeners.

== Track listing ==
All songs written and sung by Rick Davies except where noted.

No.	Title	Writer(s)	Lead vocals	Length
1.	"It's a Hard World"			9:46
2.	"You Win, I Lose"			4:31
3.	"Get Your Act Together"			4:49
4.	"Live to Love You"			5:18
5.	"Some Things Never Change"			6:26
6.	"Listen to Me Please"		Davies and Hart	4:46
7.	"Sooner or Later"	Davies and Mark Hart	Mark Hart	6:50
8.	"Help Me Down That Road"			4:36
9.	"And the Light"			4:40
10.	"Give Me a Chance"	Davies and Hart	Hart	4:24
11.	"C'est What?"			8:17
12.	"Where There's a Will"			5:36
Total length:				70:03

"Give Me a Chance" was not included on all editions of the album.

== Personnel ==
Supertramp

- Rick Davies – keyboards, vocals
- Mark Hart – guitars, keyboards, vocals
- John Helliwell – saxophones, woodwinds
- Cliff Hugo – bass
- Bob Siebenberg – drums (except on "And The Light")
- Lee Thornburg – trombones, trumpets, background vocals
- Carl Verheyen – guitars
- Tom Walsh – percussion (all tracks); drums on "And The Light"

Additional personnel

- Bob Danziger – Kalimbas
- Karen Lawrence – background vocals
- Kim Nail – background vocals
- Fred Mandel – guitars on "And The Light" (uncredited as a musician on the cover)

=== Production ===
- Producers: Jack Douglas, Fred Mandel
- Executive producer: Rick Davies
- Engineers: Ian Gardiner, Jay Messina
- Assistant engineers: Ian Gardiner, Mike Scotella
- Mixing assistant: Roy Clark, Brian Hargrove
- Mastering: Bob Ludwig
- Creative director: Richard Frankel
- Cover art: Dimo Safari
- Portraits: Dennis Keeley

== Charts ==
=== Weekly charts ===
Chart (1997)	Position
Austrian Albums (Ö3 Austria)	5
Belgian Albums (Ultratop Wallonia)	9
Canada Top Albums/CDs (RPM)	44
Dutch Albums (Album Top 100)	12
French Albums (SNEP)	2
German Albums (Offizielle Top 100)	3
Hungarian Albums (MAHASZ)	23
Italian Albums (Musica e dischi)	21
Norwegian Albums (VG-lista)	19
Spanish Albums (AFYVE)	8
Swiss Albums (Schweizer Hitparade)	2
UK Albums (Official Charts)	74

=== Year-end charts ===
Chart (1997)	Position
Belgian Albums Chart (Ultratop Wallonia)	90
French Albums (SNEP)	46
German Albums (GfK Entertainment Charts)	46
Swiss Albums (Schweizer Hitparade)	49

== Certifications and sales ==
Region	Certification	Certified units/sales
France (SNEP)	2× Gold	200,000^{*}
Germany (BVMI)	Gold	250,000^{^}
Spain (Promusicae)	Gold	50,000^{^}
Switzerland (IFPI Switzerland)	Platinum	50,000^{^}
Summaries
Worldwide	—	900,000
^{*} Sales figures based on certification alone.^{^} Shipments figures based on certification alone.
