= You Win, I Lose =

1997 song by Supertramp

Single by Supertramp

from the album Some Things Never Change
- B-side: "Some Things Never Change"
- Released: 28 February 1997
- Genre: Pop rock
- Length: 4:31 (album); 3:58 (edit)
- Label: EMI
- Songwriter: Rick Davies
- Producer: Jack Douglas

Supertramp singles chronology
| "Free as a Bird" (1988) | "You Win, I Lose" (1997) | "Listen to Me, Please" (1997) |

Music video
- "You Win, I Lose" on YouTube

"You Win, I Lose" is a song by the British rock band Supertramp. It is the second track on their tenth studio album Some Things Never Change. "You Win, I Lose" also appears on Supertramp's 2005 compilation album Retrospectacle – The Supertramp Anthology.

== Overview ==
The music video for "You Win, I Lose" was directed by David Hogan and stars Anna Nicole Smith and Udo Kier.

== Track listing ==
CD

1. "You Win, I Lose" – 4:31
2. "Some Things Never Change" (edit) – 5:05

CD

1. "You Win, I Lose" (edit version) – 3:58
2. "You Win, I Lose" (album version) – 4:31
3. "Some Things Never Change" (edit version) – 5:05
4. "Some Things Never Change" (album version) – 6:26

== Personnel ==
Personnel according to the back cover.

- Rick Davies – music, lyrics, executive producer
- Jack Douglas – producer
- Jay Messina – engineer

== Charts ==
| Chart (1997) | Peak position |
|---|---|
| Austria (Ö3 Austria Top 40) | 40 |
| Canada Top Singles (RPM) | 38 |
| France (IFOP) | 58 |
| Germany (GfK) | 63 |
| Italy Airplay (Music & Media) | 10 |
