= It's Raining Again =

Single by Supertramp

from the album ...Famous Last Words...
- B-side: "Bonnie"
- Released: 22 October 1982
- Genre: Progressive pop; soft rock
- Length: 4:24
- Label: A&M
- Songwriter: Roger Hodgson
- Producers: Supertramp, Peter Henderson

Supertramp singles chronology
"Breakfast in America (live)" (1981)	"It's Raining Again" (1982)	"My Kind of Lady" (1983)

Music video
- "It's Raining Again" on YouTube

"It's Raining Again" is a song recorded by the British rock band Supertramp and released as a single from their 1982 album …Famous Last Words… with credits given to Rick Davies and Roger Hodgson, although as indicated on the album sleeve, it is a Hodgson composition. (Note: Like John Lennon and Paul McCartney of The Beatles, Hodgson and Davies joined writer's credits from 1974 until 1983, when Hodgson left the band to pursue a solo career.) The songs outro and the end of the keyboard solo incorporates the old nursery rhyme "It's Raining, It's Pouring".

== Background ==
Hodgson said: "I wrote 'It's Raining Again' on a day when I was feeling sad because I'd lost a friend. I was in England looking outside the window and it was pouring rain and literally, the song came to me. I started playing these chords on this pump organ and I just started singing "It's Raining Again"."

== Music video ==
The music video was directed by Russell Mulcahy and conceptualized by Keith Williams. A man drives a beat-up convertible through a dust storm to a small town cafe to bring a bouquet to his girlfriend, who is a waitress there. A co-worker hands him a Dear John letter. After having his parked car ticketed for heading the wrong way (although, curiously, the car had also been headed the right way, just before that point), he spends a forgettable night at the Pickwick Drive-In movie "Famous Last Words" (reminding viewers about Supertramp's album), seeing himself on the film, watching another couple embrace in the car next to his, and meeting a small child with silver teeth, who points out that his car's left rear wheel is missing.

The next day the man, now on the street outside the cafe without his car, kisses the young girl, leaves the bouquet with her, and with his suitcase boards a bus to downtown Los Angeles. He is greeted by a guitar-playing passenger, then an uninterested cowboy props his long legs onto the seat in front of him, next to a lady putting on lipstick and wearing a white wig that receives a paper airplane thrown by another passenger. Awakened by the driver at the station, the man, now the last passenger still on the bus, finds himself without anything in his pockets, presumably having been robbed, but still with his suitcase. He thumbs down two rednecks in a pickup truck, who find him easy pickings for practical jokes, pitch him onto Hollywood Boulevard, and throw his suitcase onto him. After a short walk, encountering more rough people, the man suffers a back alley beating in which he is stripped to his underwear and robbed of his suitcase. An old lady gives him an orange umbrella just before rain begins to drench the alley. In spite of a sea of black umbrellas, he accidentally runs into his true love, who is under a yellow umbrella, and the two embrace and dance together in the rain. The sea of black umbrellas disappears. This final encounter is what had appeared and now appears at the end of the aforementioned drive-in movie. As the camera pulls back, the couple in the convertible now has two children in the back seat while the song fades out with the children's nursery rhyme "it's raining, it's pouring..."

The five members of Supertramp all appear in the video. At the beginning, John Helliwell is a street musician playing an alto saxophone. Before the first chorus, Dougie Thomson appears as the bus driver (this was the last filmed video where Thomson would appear with his then trademark moustache and beard). Roger Hodgson plays the guitar-playing bus passenger. Lastly, Rick Davies and Bob Siebenberg play the two pickup truck rednecks.

== Reception ==
Cash Box said it is "vintage Supertramp with all of the elements that have made the group’s sound so distinctive" and that it is "bouncy and hook-laden." Billboard called it a "lush midtempo charmer."

The song debuted at No. 31 on 30 October 1982 on the Billboard Hot 100, becoming the second highest debut on that chart for all of 1982 (exceeded only by "Ebony and Ivory" at No. 29 on 10 April 1982), but it only peaked at No. 11, making it one of the few songs to enter the chart in the Top 40 but not reach the Top 10.

Hodgson rated it as one of the top 10 songs he ever wrote.

== Track listings ==
=== 7-inch vinyl ===
Side one
No.	Title	Length
1.	"It's Raining Again"	4:25

Side two
No.	Title	Length
1.	"Bonnie"	5:37

== Personnel ==
- Roger Hodgson – lead vocals and backing vocals, piano and glockenspiel
- Rick Davies – synthesizers and melodica
- John Helliwell – baritone saxophone and tenor saxophone
- Dougie Thomson – bass
- Bob Siebenberg – drums

== Charts ==
=== Weekly charts ===
Chart (1982–1983)	Peak position
Australia (Kent Music Report)	11
Austrian Singles Chart	7
Canada RPM Adult Contemporary	1
Canadian RPM Singles Chart	4
Dutch GfK Charts	6
Dutch Top 40	6
France (SNEP)	1
German Singles Chart	3
Irish Singles Chart	16
New Zealand (Recorded Music NZ)	19
Norwegian Singles Chart	6
South Africa	6
Swiss Singles Chart	2
UK Singles Chart	26
US Billboard Hot 100	11
US Billboard Adult Contemporary	5
US Billboard Mainstream Rock	7
US Cash Box Top 100	7

=== Year-end charts ===
Chart (1982)	Position
Canada Top Singles (RPM)	48

== Certifications ==
Region	Certification	Certified units/sales
Canada (Music Canada)	Gold	50,000^{^}
^{^} Shipments figures based on certification alone.
