= Goodbye Stranger =

1979 single by Supertramp

Single by Supertramp

from the album Breakfast in America
- B-side: "Even in the Quietest Moments"
- Released: July 1979 (US); 12 October 1979 (UK)
- Recorded: 1978
- Studio: The Village Recorder, Los Angeles
- Genre: Progressive pop; pop rock
- Length: 5:50
- Label: A&M
- Songwriter: Rick Davies
- Producers: Peter Henderson, Supertramp

Supertramp singles chronology
"Breakfast in America" (1979)	"Goodbye Stranger" (1979)	"Take the Long Way Home" (1979)

"Goodbye Stranger" is a song by the British rock band Supertramp; it was written by Rick Davies. The song first appeared on their sixth studio album, Breakfast in America (1979). The lyrics present an "optimistic view from a drifter".

== Reception ==
Billboard described "Goodbye Stranger" as "a fluid midtempo number highlighted by the band's near falsetto vocals, dominant keyboards and a strong melody line." Cash Box said it has "intriguing, well-paced vocals" from Rick Davies, and the "high backup singing" from Roger Hodgson and "blithe, spirited instrumentation." Record World said that the "keyboard/guitar & chorus hook provide a blithe fairytale effect."

Ultimate Classic Rock critic Nick DeRiso rated it as Supertramp's fourth-best song, calling it a "snarky kiss-off from Davies" that "showcases the band's predilection for the Wurlitzer." Brett Milano of UDiscover Music rated Roger Hodgson's guitar solo at the end of the song as one of the 100 all-time greatest. Gary Graff of Billboard rated "Goodbye Stranger" as Supertramp's ninth best song, saying it's "one of the best executed trade-offs between Davies and Hodgson vocals" and has one of Supertramp's "hottest guitar solos."

== Personnel ==
- Rick Davies – Wurlitzer electronic piano, Hammond organ, lead vocals
- Roger Hodgson – electric guitar, harmony vocals
- John Helliwell – harmony vocals, whistling
- Dougie Thomson – bass guitar
- Bob Siebenberg – drums

== Charts ==
Despite being met with only limited success in the UK, it was a major hit elsewhere, even a Top 20 hit in the United States and Canada, reaching number 15 and 6 respectively.

=== Weekly charts ===
Chart (1979–80)	Peak position
Canada Top Singles (RPM)	6
Canada RPM Adult Contemporary	9
French Singles Chart	9
Netherlands (Single Top 100)	41
New Zealand (Recorded Music NZ)	40
Spain (AFE)	28
UK Singles (Official Charts)	57
US Adult Contemporary (Billboard)	32
US Billboard Hot 100	15
US Cash Box Top 100	16

=== Year-end charts ===
Chart (1979)	Rank
Canada Top Singles (RPM)	58
US (Joel Whitburn's Pop Annual)	108

== Certifications ==
Region	Certification	Certified units/sales
Canada (Music Canada)	Gold	75,000^{^}
United Kingdom (BPI)	Silver	200,000^{‡}
^{^} Shipments figures based on certification alone.^{‡} Sales+streaming figures based on certification alone.

== In popular culture ==
The song plays in many films and television programs. In the episode "Goodbye, Toby" of The Office, Michael Scott sings a parody of "Goodbye Stranger" entitled "Goodbye, Toby". In the episode "Goodbye Stranger" in the eighth season of Supernatural, the song plays on the Impala's radio after the angel Castiel disappears. The song plays in the trailer of the 2023 film Beau Is Afraid. It is also played in the 1999 film Magnolia, and the 2017 film I, Tonya. It is featured in the second season finale of Hacks. The song is played in the first episode of the second season of the television show Reacher.

The song was referenced in the novel El testigo by Mexican writer Juan Villoro, when the main character Julio Valdivieso listens to the song on the street and calls the band castrati industrial.
