= Bloody Well Right =

Single by Supertramp

from the album Crime of the Century
- A-side: "Dreamer"
- Released: 1 November 1974 (UK); 3 February 1975 (US)
- Recorded: 1974
- Genre: Rock
- Length: 4:32
- Label: A&M
- Songwriters: Rick Davies, Roger Hodgson
- Producers: Supertramp, Ken Scott

Supertramp singles chronology
"Dreamer" (1974)	"'Bloody Well Right'" (1974)	"Lady" (1975)

Crime of the Century track listing
- 1. "School"; 2. "Bloody Well Right"; 3. "Hide in Your Shell"; 4. "Asylum"; 5. "Dreamer"; 6. "Rudy"; 7. "If Everyone Was Listening"; 8. "Crime of the Century"

Official audio
- "Bloody Well Right" on YouTube

"Bloody Well Right" is a song by British rock band Supertramp from their 1974 album Crime of the Century. It appeared as the B-side of the single "Dreamer" in November 1974. Listeners in the United States preferred it to the A-side, and "Bloody Well Right" became their breakthrough hit in the country, peaking at number 35 on the Billboard Hot 100.

== Lyrical content ==
Davies consciously linked the song to the album's opening track "School" with the line "So you think your schooling is phoney", helping to perpetuate the false impression that Crime of the Century is a concept album. According to Hodgson, any unifying thread beyond that was left to the listener's imagination. Ultimate Classic Rock critic Nick DeRiso stated "Bloody Well Right" shares the theme with "School" of "questioning the education system."

== Reception ==
DeRiso rated it as Supertramp's second best song, praising its "sharp anti-authoritarian streak." Gary Graff of Billboard also rated it as Supertramp's second best song, calling it "an angry indictment of British economic caste systems couched with hard rock, jazz and music hall references."

== Live versions ==
This song appears on Paris, Live '88, It Was the Best of Times, and Is Everybody Listening?.

In June 1975 the song was performed by the band on the American late-night musical variety series The Midnight Special, but was broadcast mostly in negative.

== Personnel ==
- Rick Davies – Wurlitzer electronic piano, synth, acoustic piano, lead vocals, handclaps
- Roger Hodgson – electric guitar, backing vocals, handclaps
- John Helliwell – tenor saxophone, backing vocals
- Dougie Thomson – bass
- Bob Siebenberg – drums

== Charts ==
Chart (1975)	Peak position
Canada Top Singles (RPM)	49
US Billboard Hot 100	35

== Certifications ==
Certifications for "We're Going to Be Friends"
Region	Certification	Certified units/sales
New Zealand (RMNZ)	Gold	15,000^{‡}
^{‡} Sales+streaming figures based on certification alone.
