= Free as a Bird (album) =

Studio album by Supertramp
- Released: 23 October 1987
- Recorded: 1987
- Studios: Ocean Way, Hollywood; The Backyard, Encino
- Genres: Pop, dance-pop, synthpop, pop rock
- Length: 44:17
- Label: A&M
- Producers: Rick Davies, Tom Lord-Alge, Supertramp

Supertramp chronology
The Autobiography of Supertramp (1986)	Free as a Bird (1987)	Live '88 (1988)

Singles from Free as a Bird
- 1. "I'm Beggin' You" Released: October 1987; 2. "Free as a Bird" Released: December 1987; 3. "It's Alright" Released: 1988 (Europe)

Free as a Bird is the ninth studio album by the British rock band Supertramp, released in October 1987, and their last album of new music for A&M Records.

The album was a turn of direction of sorts, with most of the songs stepping back from their progressive rock sound, employing synthesised dance beats and rhythms. Chief songwriter Rick Davies later recalled, "Free as a Bird was an experiment to try and be modern and build it up with computers and drum machines and have people come in one by one, which makes you lose the band spirit a little bit." In the liner notes to the 2005 compilation Retrospectacle, Davies said, "Each time we went in, we would try to give it something a bit different. Free as a Bird was a lot more machine-based than anything we'd done before. That was good and bad, but it had some interesting songs on it."

== Overview ==
Free as a Bird was the first Supertramp album to feature contributions from guitarist/vocalist Mark Hart. He would later become a full-fledged member of the group, as would trumpet player Lee Thornburg.

Despite the fact that "I'm Beggin' You" was a club chart-topping hit and Free as a Bird's title cut was a minor hit, the album did not do well peaking at No. 101, making it the first Supertramp album since 1971's Indelibly Stamped not to crack Billboard's Top 100 on the album charts.

The group disbanded after the tour in support of the album and would not reconvene until 1997. They did so without bassist Dougie Thomson.

A remastered CD version of the album was released on 30 July 2002 on A&M Records. The remastered CD comes with all of the original album artwork, lyrics and credits.

== Artwork ==
Originally, the vinyl album featured four color variants – blue (pictured), green, yellow and pink. The bird in the picture was a cut-out.

The cover depicts a photograph of Georges Braque in his studio, painting a stylized bird. The bird silhouette also appeared on the LP and CD label.

== Reception ==
Professional ratings
Review scores
Source	Rating
AllMusic	1.5/5 stars
Encyclopedia of Popular Music	2/5 stars
The Great Rock Discography	4/10
MusicHound	1.5/5
NME	2/10
The Rolling Stone Album Guide	1/5 stars

AllMusic's Stephen Thomas Erlewine brief retrospective review dismissed Free as a Bird as "a colorless and tuneless collection of prog rock meandering".

== Track listing ==
All tracks are written by Rick Davies, except where noted.

Side one
No.	Title	Writer(s)	Length
1.	"It's Alright"		5:01
2.	"Not the Moment"		4:37
3.	"It Doesn't Matter"		4:53
4.	"Where I Stand*"	Davies, Mark Hart	3:42
5.	"Free as a Bird"		4:25

Side two
No.	Title	Length
6.	"I'm Beggin' You"	5:30
7.	"You Never Can Tell with Friends"	4:19
8.	"Thing for You"	4:00
9.	"An Awful Thing to Waste"	7:50
Total length:		44:17

Note: Called "Where I Stand with you" on digital platforms and Supertramp's official page. Titled "Where I Stand" on CD, LP and cassette.

== Personnel ==
Supertramp

- Rick Davies – keyboards, vocals, timbales on track 1
- John Helliwell – saxophone, brass
- Dougie Thomson – bass
- Bob Siebenberg – drums, percussion

Additional personnel

- Mark Hart – keyboards, guitars, vocals
- Marty Walsh – guitar, background vocals
- Lee Thornburg – trumpet, brass
- Nick Lane – brass
- Scott Page – brass
- Lon Price – brass
- David Woodford – brass
- Steve Reid – percussion
- Linda Foot – background vocals
- Lise Miller – background vocals
- Evan Rogers – background vocals
- Karyn White – background vocals

Production

- Rick Davies – producer
- Tom Lord-Alge – mixing, co-producer on "It's Alright"
- Supertramp – producer
- Norman Hall – engineer
- Bob Loftus – assistant engineer
- Jeff Lorenzen – assistant engineer
- Bob Ludwig – original LP mastering
- Greg Calbi – remastering
- Jay Messina – remastering
- Richard Frankel – art direction
- Richard Frankel – design
- Raul Vega – photography

2002 A&M reissue The 2002 A&M Records reissue was mastered from the original master tapes by Greg Calbi and Jay Messina at Sterling Sound, New York, 2002. The reissue was supervised by Bill Levenson with art direction by Vartan and design by Mike Diehl, with production coordination by Beth Stempel.

== Charts ==
=== Weekly charts ===
Chart (1987)	Position
Australian Albums (Kent Music Report)	30
Canada Top Albums/CDs (RPM)	34
Dutch Albums (Album Top 100)	32
French Albums (SNEP)	24
German Albums (Offizielle Top 100)	23
Spanish Albums (AFYVE)	16
Swedish Albums (Sverigetopplistan)	28
Swiss Albums (Schweizer Hitparade)	14
UK Albums (Official Charts)	93
US Billboard 200	101

=== Year-end charts ===
Chart (1987)	Position
French Albums (SNEP)	66

== Certifications ==
Region	Certification	Certified units/sales
Canada (Music Canada)	Gold	50,000^{^}
France (SNEP)	Gold	100,000^{*}
Spain (Promusicae)	Gold	50,000^{^}
Switzerland (IFPI Switzerland)	Gold	25,000^{^}
^{*} Sales figures based on certification alone.^{^} Shipments figures based on certification alone.
