= Brother Where You Bound =

Studio album by Supertramp
- Released: 13 May 1985
- Recorded: 1984–1985
- Studios: Ocean Way, Hollywood; The Backyard, Encino
- Genres: Progressive rock; pop rock; blues rock
- Length: 42:44
- Label: A&M
- Producers: David Kershenbaum, Supertramp

Supertramp chronology
...Famous Last Words... (1982)	Brother Where You Bound (1985)	The Autobiography of Supertramp (1986)

Singles from Brother Where You Bound
- 1. "Cannonball" Released: 29 April 1985; 2. "Still in Love" Released: 19 July 1985; 3. "Better Days" Released: September 1985 (US)

Brother Where You Bound, released in 1985, is the eighth studio album by the British rock band Supertramp. It was their first album after original member Roger Hodgson left the band, leaving Rick Davies to handle the songwriting and singing on his own. The album features the group's Top 30 hit "Cannonball".

Brother Where You Bound reached number 20 on the UK Albums Chart and number 21 on The Billboard 200 in 1985, and went Gold according to the band's then label A&M Records in 1985, although the RIAA hasn't certified it yet.

A remastered CD version of the album was released on 30 July 2002 on A&M Records.

== Songs ==
The track "Better Days" features an extended fade-out with voice-overs by the four key players in the 1984 US presidential campaign: quotes spoken by Geraldine Ferraro and Walter Mondale sounding from the left audio channel and those of George H. W. Bush and Ronald Reagan on the right, mixed with John Helliwell's extended saxophone solo. Cash Box called that song "a solidly driving rocker" and praised the production values and melody.

The album's 16-and-a-half-minute title track featured Thin Lizzy's Scott Gorham on rhythm guitar, Pink Floyd's David Gilmour on the guitar solos, and readings from George Orwell's 1984. A demo for the song was recorded prior to Roger Hodgson's departure from the band, for potential inclusion on …Famous Last Words…, but the band ultimately felt it was too densely progressive rock to be appropriate, and decided against recording it for the album. At the time of the demo, the song was only ten minutes long.

== Release ==
To build interest in the release, the album was premiered to dozens of members of the press traveling aboard a specially chartered trip on the Orient Express from Paris to Venice, where reporters were shown the full video for "Brother Where You Bound". The normally low-profile group also did extensive radio and TV appearances, including a high-profile appearance on radio's Rockline after a simulcast of the "Brother Where You Bound" video on MTV and Global Satellite Network.

== Reception ==
Professional ratings
Review scores
Source	Rating
AllMusic	3/5 stars
Encyclopedia of Popular Music	2/5 stars
The Rolling Stone Album Guide	1/5 stars

AllMusic's retrospective review is positive, noting that the album's thematic exploration of Cold War tensions "is dated and hasn't aged very well… but the music is a pleasure." They particularly praised the "crystalline sound", the strong performances of the guest musicians, and the complexity of the compositions. They also praised the band for being "gutsy" enough to "re-embrace its progressive-rock roots" while improving their pop songcraft at the same time.

In a review special, Prog Sphere writes, "Brother Where You Bound is a prime example of 'crossover' prog at its very best, and as such highly recommended to anyone but those prog fans who think that 'pop' is inevitably a bad word."

== Track listing ==
All tracks are written by Rick Davies.

Side one
No.	Title	Length
1.	"Cannonball"	7:38
2.	"Still in Love"	4:36
3.	"No Inbetween"	4:36
4.	"Better Days"	6:15

Side two
No.	Title	Length
1.	"Brother Where You Bound"	16:30
2.	"Ever Open Door"	3:06

== Personnel ==
Supertramp

- Rick Davies – keyboards, lead and backing vocals
- John Helliwell – saxophones, glockenspiel on track 1
- Dougie Thomson – bass
- Bob Siebenberg – drums

Additional personnel

- David Gilmour – guitar solos on "Brother Where You Bound"
- Scott Gorham – rhythm guitar on "Brother Where You Bound"
- Marty Walsh – guitar on "Cannonball", "Better Days", "Brother Where You Bound", and "Still in Love"
- Doug Wintz – trombone on "Cannonball"
- Cha Cha – backing vocals on "Still in Love"
- Brian Banks – Synclavier programming
- Anthony Marinelli – Synclavier programming
- Gary Chang – Fairlight & PPG programming
- Scott Page – flute on "Better Days" and "Brother Where You Bound"

== Production ==
- Producers: David Kershenbaum, Supertramp
- Engineer: Norman Hall
- Assistant engineer: Steve Crimmel
- Mixing: Mark Ettel
- Mixing assistant: Steve McMillan
- Mastering: Bob Ludwig
- Remastering: Greg Calbi, Jay Messina
- Track engineer: Allen Sides
- Programming: Gary Chang
- Synclavier programming: Brian Banks, Anthony Marinelli
- Art direction: Norman Moore
- Design: Norman Moore
- Tray photo: Tom Gibson

2002 A&M reissue:
The 2002 A&M Records reissue was mastered from the original master tapes by Greg Calbi and Jay Messina at Sterling Sound, New York, 2002. The reissue was supervised by Bill Levenson with art direction by Vartan and design by Mike Diehl, with production coordination by Beth Stempel.

== Singles ==
Charts – Billboard (United States)

Year	Single	Chart	Position
1985	"Cannonball"	Hot Dance Music/Club Play	9
1985	"Cannonball"	Hot Dance Music/Maxi-Singles Sales	25
1985	"Cannonball"	Mainstream Rock Tracks	4
1985	"Cannonball"	Billboard Hot 100	28

== Charts ==
=== Weekly charts ===
Chart (1985)	Peak position
Australian Albums (Kent Music Report)	22
Austrian Albums (Ö3 Austria)	13
Canada Top Albums/CDs (RPM)	11
Dutch Albums (Album Top 100)	4
French Albums (SNEP)	3
German Albums (Offizielle Top 100)	4
Italian Albums (Musica e dischi)	19
New Zealand Albums (RMNZ)	17
Norwegian Albums (VG-lista)	6
Spanish Albums (AFYVE)	3
Swedish Albums (Sverigetopplistan)	7
Swiss Albums (Schweizer Hitparade)	2
UK Albums (Official Charts)	20
US Billboard 200	21

Chart (2025)	Peak position
Greek Albums (IFPI)	42

=== Year-end charts ===
Chart (1985)	Position
Canada Top Albums/CDs (RPM)	56
French Albums (SNEP)	18
Italian Albums (Musica e dischi)[	90
Swiss Albums (Schweizer Hitparade)	15

== Certifications ==
Region	Certification	Certified units/sales
Canada (Music Canada)	Platinum	100,000^{^}
France (SNEP)	Gold	100,000^{*}
Germany (BVMI)	Gold	250,000^{^}
Spain (Promusicae)	Gold	50,000^{^}
^{*} Sales figures based on certification alone.^{^} Shipments figures based on certification alone.
