= Marty Walsh (musician) =

American songwriter

- Born: Martin Kevin Walsh; January 21, 1952 (age 74); Hollywood, California, U.S.
- Occupations: Musician; songwriter; arranger; composer; record producer
- Instruments: Guitar; vocals
- Years active: 1976–present
- Website: Official website

Martin Kevin Walsh (born January 21, 1952) is an American guitarist, songwriter, arranger, composer and record producer. In 1979 Walsh had the opportunity to play on his first Billboard charting song, "Love Pains", by Yvonne Elliman. During his career as a session musician in the 1980s, Walsh participated as a guitarist on hits "I Was Country When Country Wasn't Cool" by Barbara Mandrell, "9 to 5" by Dolly Parton, "She Works Hard for the Money" by Donna Summer and "Heartlight" by Neil Diamond. Among Walsh's credits on albums of artists such as John Denver, Eddie Kendricks, Seals and Crofts, Julio Iglesias, Kenny Rogers and John Fogerty, he was also a touring musician with Supertramp, and took part in recording the albums Brother Where You Bound in 1985 and Free as a Bird in 1987. Walsh contributed to three of LeAnn Rimes' albums in the late 1990s, Sittin' on Top of the World (1998), LeAnn Rimes (1999) and I Need You (2001)

Aside from his session work, Walsh has written music for Air Supply, Gary Wright, Agnetha Fältskog of ABBA, and a number of television series including Roundhouse. Walsh was also seen on Eddie Money's music video for "Shakin'" as the rhythm guitarist in 1982.

Currently, Walsh is an assistant professor at the Berklee College of Music in the ensemble and music production departments in Boston, Massachusetts.
