= Cannonball (Supertramp song) =

1985 single by Supertramp

Single by Supertramp

from the album Brother Where You Bound
- B-side: "Ever Open Door"
- Released: 29 April 1985
- Genre: Progressive rock, jazz rock
- Length: 4:59 (single version); 7:38 (album version); 7:42 (12-inch Direct-To-Disc "Audiophile" Version); 10:00 (12-inch Instrumental version)
- Label: A&M
- Songwriter: Rick Davies
- Producers: Supertramp, David Kershenbaum

Supertramp singles chronology
"Still in Love" (1985)	"Cannonball" (1985)	"Better Days" (1985)

Music video
- "Cannonball" on YouTube

"Cannonball" is the opening track from Supertramp's 1985 album Brother Where You Bound.

== Overview ==
"Cannonball" was written and sung by keyboardist Rick Davies entirely in the chord of G minor. Davies stated in an interview "I did it simply to see if it could be done".

When “Cannonball” was released, the song’s lyrics (like “I’m washing my hands on you / How could you be so untrue”) were, contrary to belief, not about Roger Hodgson's departure from the band after the 1982 album ...Famous Last Words...for a solo career, but instead (according to a French radio interview) a “less than perfect” concert promoter Rick Davies never named.

The track became Supertramp's last US Top 40 single, peaking at number 28 on the Billboard Hot 100 in July 1985. It also crossed over to the Hot Dance Club Play chart, peaking at number nine. On the B-side of the 12-inch release is a 10-minute instrumental version.

Near the LP version's fade-out, the brass play a citation of the Jazz tune "Topsy".

The promo video was directed by Steve Barron and depicts a caveman who goes after his wayward cavewoman, who left their home to travel to modern day Grand Junction, Colorado, to see the band rehearsing the song on stage. When he sees her, he bellows and wakes up to see the cavewoman there in the cave, realizing he had dreamed it all.

== Personnel ==
Supertramp

- Rick Davies – piano, synthesizer, lead vocals
- John Helliwell – saxophone, glockenspiel
- Bob Siebenberg – drums
- Dougie Thomson – bass

Additional personnel

- Marty Walsh – guitar
- Doug Wintz – trombone

== Chart performance ==
Chart (1985)	Peak position
Australia (KMR)	63
Canada (RPM)	24
Dutch Top 40	35
German Singles Chart	60
Swiss Singles Chart	25
US Billboard Hot 100	28
US Billboard Mainstream Rock Tracks	4
US Billboard Hot Dance Club Play	9
