= Crisis? What Crisis? =

Studio album by Supertramp
- Released: 28 November 1975
- Recorded: Summer 1975
- Studios: A&M (Hollywood); Ramport (London); Scorpio Sound (London)
- Genre: Progressive rock
- Length: 47:24
- Label: A&M
- Producers: Ken Scott; Supertramp

Supertramp chronology
Crime of the Century (1974)	Crisis? What Crisis? (1975)	Even in the Quietest Moments... (1977)

Singles from Crisis? What Crisis?
- 1. "Lady" Released: 21 November 1975; 2. "Ain't Nobody but Me" Released: 23 April 1976

Crisis? What Crisis? is the fourth studio album by the British rock band Supertramp, released on 28 November 1975, by A&M Records. It was recorded in both London and Los Angeles, marking the group's first use of American recording studios.

A remastered CD edition was issued on 11 June 2002, featuring the original artwork and credits as well as printed lyrics, which were absent from the initial release.

Record Mirror listed Crisis? What Crisis? among the best albums of 1975 in its year-end survey.

== Background and recording ==
Following the commercial breakthrough of Crime of the Century (1974), Supertramp's record label pressed the band to deliver a follow-up quickly. While touring North America in early 1975, guitarist and vocalist Roger Hodgson injured his hand, forcing the cancellation of remaining dates. The downtime was used to begin work on the next album.

Despite the additional time, the band entered the studio with little new material, relying heavily on leftover compositions from Crime of the Century and earlier. The shortage of songs forced a temporary halt in production while Hodgson and keyboardist Rick Davies wrote additional tracks, including "Ain't Nobody But Me". Four songs—"Sister Moonshine", "Another Man's Woman", "Lady", and "Just a Normal Day"—had already been performed live and were later issued on the 2001 concert release Is Everybody Listening?.

Contemporary accounts suggest mixed feelings among the band. Hodgson described the album as hastily assembled and lacking the conceptual unity of Crime of the Century. Bassist Dougie Thomson echoed this view, calling it disjointed. In contrast, Hodgson later remarked in the mid-1980s that it was his personal favourite of the group's albums.

Music writers have noted elements of continuity with Supertramp's later work. For example, Ultimate Classic Rock observed that the melody of "Sister Moonshine" anticipates the group's later hit "Give a Little Bit".

== Artwork ==
The album's title and cover concept were devised by Davies. The sleeve depicts a man relaxing in a deckchair under an umbrella amid an industrial wasteland, photographed by Paul Wakefield. The background was shot in the Welsh mining valleys and later composited with the studio model. The imagery was partly inspired by Yves Robert's 1968 film Alexandre le bienheureux. The phrase "Crisis? What crisis?" also appeared in Fred Zinnemann's 1973 film The Day of the Jackal and was later used by the British press during the Winter of Discontent.

== Critical reception ==
Professional ratings
Review scores
Source	Rating
AllMusic	3/5 stars
Encyclopedia of Popular Music	4/5 stars
The Great Rock Discography	6/10
The Rolling Stone Album Guide	2/5 stars

Contemporary reviews were mixed. Rolling Stone offered a largely negative assessment, criticising the lyrics in particular. Retrospective appraisals have been more favourable. AllMusic highlighted Rick Davies' keyboard playing, Hodgson's vocals, and John Helliwell's saxophone contributions, describing the record as warm and subtly engaging.

== Track listing ==
All tracks are written by Rick Davies and Roger Hodgson.

Side one
No.	Title	Lead vocals	Length
1.	"Easy Does It"	Hodgson	2:19
2.	"Sister Moonshine"	Hodgson	5:15
3.	"Ain't Nobody but Me"	Davies	5:14
4.	"A Soapbox Opera"	Hodgson	4:54
5.	"Another Man's Woman"	Davies	6:15

Side two
No.	Title	Lead vocals	Length
6.	"Lady"	Hodgson	5:26
7.	"Poor Boy"	Davies	5:07
8.	"Just a Normal Day"	Davies/Hodgson	4:02
9.	"The Meaning"	Hodgson	5:23
10.	"Two of Us"	Hodgson	3:26
Total length:			47:23

== Personnel ==
Supertramp

- Rick Davies – lead and backing vocals, acoustic piano (tracks 3, 5, 7, 8), Wurlitzer piano (track 7), harmonica (track 2), organ (tracks 2, 3, 6, 10), harpsichord (tracks 4, 6, 10), synthesizers (tracks 1, 2, 4, 6, 8, 9)
- Roger Hodgson – lead and backing vocals, electric guitar (tracks 1, 2, 3, 5, 6, 7, 9) 12-string guitar (tracks 1, 2, 9, 10), acoustic piano (track 4), Wurlitzer piano (track 6), flageolet (track 2), cello (track 7), pump organ (track 10), marimba (track 6), electric sitar (tracks 1, 2)
- John Anthony Helliwell – saxophones, clarinet and bass clarinet (tracks 7, 10), backing vocals (tracks 3, 6, 7, 10)
- Dougie Thomson – bass guitar
- Bob Siebenberg (credited as Bob C. Benberg) – drums, percussion

=== Production ===
- Ken Scott - producer
- Supertramp - producers
- Greg Calbi - remastering
- Jay Messina - remastering
- John Jansen - assistant
- Ed Thacker - assistant
- Richard Anthony Hewson - arranger
- Fabio Nicoli - cover design
- Paul Wakefield - cover design
- Dick Ward - cover design

2002 A&M reissue The 2002 A&M Records reissue was mastered from the original master tapes by Greg Calbi and Jay Messina at Sterling Sound, New York, 2002. The reissue was supervised by Bill Levenson with art direction by Vartan and design by Mike Diehl, with production coordination by Beth Stempel.

== Charts ==
=== Weekly charts ===
Chart (1976–77)	Peak position
Australian Albums (Kent Music Report)	20
Canada Top Albums/CDs (RPM)	12
Dutch Albums (Album Top 100)	11
New Zealand Albums (RMNZ)	6
Norwegian Albums (VG-lista)	10
Swedish Albums (Sverigetopplistan)	16
UK Albums (Official Charts)	20
US Billboard 200	44

Chart (2025)	Peak position
Greek Albums (IFPI)	52

=== Year-end charts ===
Chart (1976)	Peak position
Australian Albums (Kent Music Report)	85
Canada Top Albums/CDs (RPM)	85
New Zealand Albums (RMNZ)	21

Chart (1977)	Peak position
New Zealand Albums (RMNZ)	27

== Certifications ==
Region	Certification	Certified units/sales
Canada (Music Canada)	Platinum	100,000^{^}
France (SNEP)	Gold	100,000^{*}
Germany (BVMI)	Gold	250,000^{^}
United Kingdom (BPI) Sales since 2003	Silver	60,000^{‡}
^{*} Sales figures based on certification alone.^{^} Shipments figures based on certification alone.^{‡} Sales+streaming figures based on certification alone.
