= Breakfast in America =

Studio album by Supertramp
- Released: 16 March 1979
- Recorded: May–December 1978
- Studio: The Village Recorder (Studio B) (Los Angeles)
- Genres: Progressive pop; art rock; soft rock
- Length: 46:06
- Label: A&M
- Producers: Peter Henderson; Supertramp

Supertramp chronology
Even in the Quietest Moments... (1977)	Breakfast in America (1979)	Paris (1980)

Singles from Breakfast in America
- 1. "The Logical Song" Released: March 1979; 2. "Breakfast in America" Released: June 1979; 3. "Goodbye Stranger" Released: July 1979; 4. "Take the Long Way Home" Released: October 1979

Breakfast in America is the sixth studio album by the British rock band Supertramp, released on 16 March 1979, by A&M Records. It was recorded from May to December 1978 at The Village Recorder in Los Angeles. It spawned three US Billboard Hot 100 hit singles: "The Logical Song" (No. 6), "Goodbye Stranger" (No. 15), and "Take the Long Way Home" (No. 10). In the UK, "The Logical Song" and the title track were both top 10 hits, the only two the group had in their native country.

At the 22nd Annual Grammy Awards in 1980, Breakfast in America won two awards for Best Album Package and Best Engineered Non-Classical Recording, as well as nominations for Album of the Year and Best Pop Performance by a Duo or Group with Vocals. It became Supertramp's best-selling album, being certified 4× Platinum by the Recording Industry Association of America (RIAA) for more than four million copies sold in the US, where it was No. 1 on the Billboard 200 for six weeks.

== Background ==
As with Even in the Quietest Moments..., Rick Davies and Roger Hodgson wrote most of their songs separately but conceived the theme for the album jointly. Their original concept was for an album of songs about the relationship and conflicting ideals between Davies and Hodgson themselves, to be titled Hello Stranger. Hodgson explained: "We realized that a few of the songs really lent themselves to two people talking to each other and at each other. I could be putting down his way of thinking and he could be challenging my way of seeing life [...] Our ways of life are so different, but I love him. That contrast is what makes the world go 'round and what makes Supertramp go 'round. His beliefs are a challenge to mine and my beliefs are a challenge to his."

This idea was eventually scrapped in favour of an album of "fun" songs, and though Davies initially wanted to keep the title Hello Stranger, he was convinced by Hodgson to change it to Breakfast in America. Hodgson commented later: "We chose the title because it was a fun title. It suited the fun feeling of the album." Due to the title and the explicit satirising of American culture in the cover and three of the songs ("Gone Hollywood", "Breakfast in America" and "Child of Vision"), many listeners interpreted the album as a whole as being a satire of the United States. Supertramp's members have all insisted that the repeated references to US culture are purely coincidental and that no such thematic satire was intended. Hodgson has described the misconception as a parallel to how Crime of the Century (1974) is often misinterpreted as being a concept album.

"Gone Hollywood" is the opening track of Breakfast in America. Written by Rick Davies, the song tells about a person who moves to Los Angeles in hopes of becoming a movie star, but finds it far more difficult than he imagined. He struggles and becomes frustrated, until he ultimately gets his break and becomes "the talk of the Boulevard". The lyrics were originally more bleak, but under pressure from the other band members, Davies rewrote them to be more optimistic and commercially appealing. Billboard writer David Farrell felt that, other than Davies' lead vocal, the song sounds like a Queen song.

"Child of Vision" is the closing track. Much like "The Logical Song", it uses a Wurlitzer electric piano as the main instrument. After the lyrical part, the song goes into a long solo played on the grand piano alongside the original melody on the Wurlitzer. The track fades out with a short saxophone solo by John Helliwell. Roger Hodgson has said that the song was written to be an equivalent to "Gone Hollywood", looking at how Americans live, though he confessed that he had only a limited familiarity with US culture at the time of writing. He also said there is a slight possibility that he subconsciously had Rick Davies in mind while writing the lyrics.

Each song was credited to a single musician on the inner sleeve, but on the central vinyl label was printed "Words and Music by Roger Hodgson & Rick Davies", combining the two and confusing the issue of composition credit. Roger Hodgson's management has described "The Logical Song", "Breakfast in America", "Take the Long Way Home", "Lord Is It Mine" and "Child of Vision" as "Roger's songs"; however, this apparently does not mean he necessarily wrote them by himself, for Hodgson has credited Davies with writing the vocal harmony on "The Logical Song". Davies has referred to "The five songs that I did on Breakfast", but has not specified which ones.

== Recording ==
The album went through two rounds of demos. The first were home demos, each of which consisted of the chief songwriter (either Rick Davies or Roger Hodgson) singing and playing either acoustic piano or Wurlitzer electric piano. The second were eight-track demos recorded at Southcombe Studios in Burbank, California during late April and early May 1978. It was in recording these demos that the band worked out the backing track arrangements for all the songs (with the exception of "Take the Long Way Home") and determined the order in which they would appear on the album.

In order to avoid spending a lot of time on mixing, the band and their production team devoted a week to experimenting with different sound setups until they found the perfect arrangement. The effort proved to be wasted, as the engineering team would end up spending more than two extremely stressful months searching for the right mix, and were finished after that length of time only because the deadline had arrived, not because they felt at all satisfied with the results.

Tensions between Hodgson and Davies were reportedly almost non-existent on the album. Engineer Peter Henderson recalled: "They got along fantastically well and everyone was really happy. There was a very, very good vibe and I think everyone was really buoyed up by the recordings and A&M's response to them." Hodgson contested this, saying that he and Davies had increasingly different lifestyles, and that he felt that Davies disliked many of his songs and kept quiet about his displeasure only because he sensed that he would be voted down. Melody Maker journalist Harry Doherty offered a third take on the duo's interactions during the album sessions: "In three days with the band, I don't think I saw Davies and Hodgson converse once, other than to exchange courteous greetings."

== Packaging ==
The album's packaging was designed by Mike Doud and Mick Haggerty. It was critically acclaimed, winning the 1980 Grammy Award for Best Recording Package.

The front cover depicts a view of Lower Manhattan through an aeroplane window, featuring a supersized diner waitress named "Libby" in the foreground, portrayed by actress Kate Murtagh. Posed in imitation of the Statue of Liberty, she holds a glass of orange juice on a small plate in place of the statue's torch and a restaurant menu bearing the words "Breakfast in America" in place of its tablet inscription. The background features Financial District buildings and landmarks represented through common kitchen items, including bottles, pots, cartons, crates, cutlery, and condiment dispensers, all rendered in a uniform off-white color. The twin towers of the World Trade Center appear as stacks of square boxes, while a plate of breakfast represents The Battery, the departure point for the Staten Island Ferry. The back cover photograph, taken at Bert's Madhouse Café in Hollywood, depicts the band members eating breakfast while reading newspapers from their respective hometowns.

Although Breakfast in America was released in 1979, 22 years before the 9/11 attacks which destroyed the World Trade Center, the album's cover became the basis for a 9/11 conspiracy theory due to the "UP" in "SUPERTRAMP" resembling "9 11" behind the twin towers if the cover is viewed in a mirror.

== Commercial performance ==
Breakfast in America topped the US Billboard 200 for six weeks and became Supertramp's best-selling album, while producing four hit singles: "The Logical Song", "Goodbye Stranger", "Take the Long Way Home" and the title track. It has sold more than three million copies in France, becoming the country's fourth best-selling album. The album also reached No. 1 in Norway, Austria, West Germany, the Netherlands, Spain, Canada, Australia and France. In Japan, the album reached number 1 on the Music Labo chart in 1979. By 2010, the album had sold over 20 million copies.

== Critical reception ==
Retrospective professional reviews
Review scores
Source	Rating
AllMusic	4.5/5 stars
Christgau's Record Guide	C+
Encyclopedia of Popular Music	4/5 stars
The Great Rock Discography	7/10
Mojo	4/5 stars
Record Collector	3/5 stars
The Rolling Stone Album Guide	3/5 stars
Smash Hits	8/10
Sputnikmusic	3/5
Uncut	3/5 stars

In a positive review for Rolling Stone magazine, music critic Stephen Holden viewed Breakfast in America as an improvement over the "swatches of meandering, Genesis-like esoterica" on Supertramp's previous albums, and called it "a textbook-perfect album of post-Beatles, keyboard-centered English art rock that strikes the shrewdest possible balance between quasi-symphonic classicism and rock & roll ... the songs here are extraordinarily melodic and concisely structured, reflecting these musicians' saturation in American pop since their move to Los Angeles in 1977." Village Voice critic Robert Christgau was less impressed, saying that the "hooky album" evokes "random grunts of pleasure" but lacks emotional substance because of "glib" lyrics and no "vocal personality (as opposed to accurate singing) and rhythmic thrust (as opposed to a beat)".

Colin Larkin, writing in the Encyclopedia of Popular Music (2006), said that the "faultless" album "elevated" Supertramp to "rock's first division".

In a retrospective review for AllMusic, Stephen Thomas Erlewine praised the album's "tightly written, catchy, well-constructed pop songs" and described it as the band's "high-water mark". John Doran of BBC Music said that the songwriting has an "unbeatable quality" and asserted that "any of the ten tracks could have been hit singles". Sputnikmusic's Tyler Fisher said that its singles are mostly the highlights because of their "catchy hooks", and found the ballads "absolutely terrible". Rob Sheffield, writing in The Rolling Stone Album Guide (2004), also felt that its "nice moments" were the highlights, including "the jolly 'Take the Long Way Home,' the adjectively crazed 'Logical Song,' [and] 'Goodbye Stranger.'" William Pinfold of Record Collector considered the album "a classic example of flawlessly-played and -produced late 70s transatlantic soft rock".

=== Accolades ===
In the 1987 edition of The World Critics List, music historian Joel Whitburn ranked Breakfast in America the fourth-greatest album of all time. In the 1994 edition of The Guinness All Time Top 1000 Albums, Breakfast in America was voted No. 207 in the all-time greatest rock and pop albums, and it was voted the 69th-greatest British rock album of all time in a 2006 Classic Rock industry poll. Triple M listeners voted the album No. 43 in the "100 Greatest Albums of All Time". Recognising the band's disfavour among music critics during their career, Q magazine ranked Breakfast in America second on its "Records it's OK to Love" list in 2006. In 2000 it was voted No. 294 in Colin Larkin's All Time Top 1000 Albums.

"The Logical Song" won the 1979 Ivor Novello Award for "Best Song Musically and Lyrically".

== Track listing ==
Side one
No.	Title	Writer(s)	Lead vocals	Length
1.	"Gone Hollywood"	Davies	Davies and Hodgson	5:19
2.	"The Logical Song"	Hodgson	Hodgson	4:07
3.	"Goodbye Stranger"	Davies	Davies	5:46
4.	"Breakfast in America"	Hodgson	Hodgson	2:37
5.	"Oh Darling"	Davies	Davies	3:43
Total length:				21:32

Side two
No.	Title	Writer(s)	Lead vocals	Length
6.	"Take the Long Way Home"	Hodgson	Hodgson	5:08
7.	"Lord Is It Mine"	Hodgson	Hodgson	4:08
8.	"Just Another Nervous Wreck"	Davies	Davies	4:22
9.	"Casual Conversations"	Davies	Davies	2:56
10.	"Child of Vision"	Hodgson	Hodgson and Davies	7:24
Total length:				23:58 45:30

=== 2010 Deluxe Edition ===
Disc one
No.	Title	Length

Disc two
No.	Title	Writer(s)	Lead vocals	Length
1.	"The Logical Song" (live 1979 at Pavillon de Paris)	Hodgson	Hodgson	4:06
2.	"Goodbye Stranger" (live 1979 at Pavillon de Paris)	Davies	Davies	6:11
3.	"Breakfast in America" (live 1979 at Wembley)	Hodgson	Hodgson	3:05
4.	"Oh Darling" (live 1979 in Miami)	Davies	Davies	4:21
5.	"Take the Long Way Home" (live 1979 at Wembley)	Hodgson	Hodgson	4:48
6.	"Another Man's Woman" (live 1979 at Pavillon de Paris)	Davies	Davies	7:32
7.	"Even in the Quietest Moments" (live 1979 at Pavillon de Paris)	Hodgson	Hodgson	5:36
8.	"Rudy" (live 1979 at Wembley)	Davies	Davies and Hodgson	7:29
9.	"Downstream" (live 1979 at Pavillon de Paris)	Davies	Davies	3:28
10.	"Give a Little Bit" (live 1979 at Pavillon de Paris)	Hodgson	Hodgson	4:03
11.	"From Now On" (live 1979 at Wembley)	Davies	Davies	6:53
12.	"Child of Vision" (live 1979 at Pavillon de Paris)	Hodgson	Hodgson and Davies	7:32

== Reissues ==
1990 Remaster

In June 1990, Mobile Fidelity Sound Lab re-released a remaster on Ultradisc™ 24 KT Gold CD from their "Original Master Recording" Collection.

2002 reissue

On 11 June 2002, A&M Records reissued Breakfast in America with full original album art, plus the label art from side one recreated on the CD. It was mastered from the original master tapes by Greg Calbi and Jay Messina at Sterling Sound, New York, 2002. The reissue was supervised by Bill Levenson with art direction by Vartan and design by Mike Diehl, with production coordination by Beth Stempel. It makes limited use of dynamic range compression and peak limiting, rejecting the loudness war trends of modern CD releases.

2010 Deluxe Edition

A deluxe edition was released on 4 October 2010, including a second disc with songs recorded live in 1979, in particular songs not appearing on the live album Paris.

2010 Super Deluxe Edition

A super deluxe edition, which was released on 6 December 2010, includes the 2-disc deluxe edition CD, vinyl LP, poster, DVD, hardcover book, and other memorabilia.

2013 Blu-ray high definition disc

A&M offers a High Definition Blu-ray Disc of the album. It contains the album in three different sound formats: 2-Channel PCM 24bit/96 kHz, 2 Channel DTS-HD Master Audio 24bit/96 kHz and 2-Channel Dolby TrueHD 24bit/96 kHz. This High Definition Blu-ray Disc is playable in all Blu-ray Disc players.

2018 Remastered Hybrid SACD

On 17 May 2018, Mobile Fidelity Sound Lab re-released a remaster on hybrid SACD.

2026 Half-speed master LP

On 23 January 2026, a half-speed master reissue of Breakfast in America was announced. It was released on 20 March 2026. The album lacquer was cut by Miles Showell at Abbey Road Studios and overseen by co-producer Peter Henderson.

== Personnel ==
Supertramp

- Rick Davies – vocals and keyboards including clavinet on track 2
- Roger Hodgson – vocals, keyboards and guitars including acoustic 12-string guitar on track 2
- John Helliwell – woodwinds, backing vocals
- Dougie Thomson – bass
- Bob Siebenberg (credited as Bob C. Benberg) – drums

Additional personnel

- Slyde Hyde – tuba and trombone
- Gary Mielke – Oberheim programming

Production

- Peter Henderson – producer, engineer
- Supertramp – producer
- Lenise Bent – assistant engineer
- Jeff Harris – assistant engineer
- Greg Calbi – remastering (2002)
- Jay Messina – remastering (2002)
- Russel Pope – concert sound engineer
- Mike Doud – art direction, cover art concept, artwork
- Mick Haggerty – art direction, cover design
- Mark Hanauer – photography
- Aaron Rapoport – cover photo

== Charts ==
=== Original album ===
==== Weekly charts ====
Weekly chart performance for Breakfast in America
Chart (1979–80)	Position
Argentinian Albums	5
Australian Albums (Kent Music Report)	1
Austrian Albums (Ö3 Austria)	1
Canada Top Albums/CDs (RPM)	1
Dutch Albums (Album Top 100)	1
Finnish Albums (The Official Finnish Charts)	23
French Albums (SNEP)	1
German Albums (Offizielle Top 100)	1
Italian Albums (Musica e dischi)	3
Japanese Albums (Oricon)	2
New Zealand Albums (RMNZ)	1
Norwegian Albums (VG-lista)	1
Spanish Albums (AFYVE)	1
Swedish Albums (Sverigetopplistan)	2
UK Albums (Official Charts)	3
US Billboard 200	1

Chart (2000-05)	Position
Spanish Albums (Promusicae)	77
Swiss Albums (Schweizer Hitparade)	85

Chart (2010-15)	Position
French Albums (SNEP)	105
Italian Albums (FIMI)	26

Chart (2019)	Position
Belgian Albums (Ultratop Wallonia)	109
Scottish Albums (Official Charts)	77

Chart (2026)	Position
German Rock & Metal Albums (Offizielle Top 100)	11

==== Year-end charts ====
Year-end chart performance for Breakfast in America
Chart (1979)	Position
Australian Albums Chart (Kent Music Report)	1
Austrian Albums (Ö3 Austria)	2
Canada Top Albums/CDs (RPM)	1
French Albums (SNEP)	2
Japanese Albums (Oricon)	29
UK Albums (OCC)	4
US Billboard 200	5

Chart (1980)	Position
Canada Top Albums/CDs (RPM)	44
US Billboard 200	21

=== Deluxe edition ===
Chart (2010)	Peak position
Belgian Albums (Ultratop Wallonia)	86
Spanish Albums (Promusicae)	62

== Certifications and sales ==
Certifications for Breakfast in America
Region	Certification	Certified units/sales
Australia (ARIA)	Gold	20,000^{^}
Belgium (BRMA)	Gold	25,000^{*}
Canada (Music Canada)	Diamond	1,500,000
Denmark (IFPI Danmark)	Gold	10,000^{‡}
France (SNEP)	Platinum	3,200,000
Germany (BVMI)	Platinum	500,000^{^}
Greece (IFPI Greece)	Gold	50,000
Israel	Gold	20,000
Italy (FIMI) 1979 sales	Platinum	500,000
Italy (FIMI) sales since 2009	Platinum	50,000^{‡}
Japan (Oricon Charts)	—	178,000
Netherlands (NVPI)	Platinum	100,000^{^}
New Zealand (RMNZ)	2× Platinum	30,000^{‡}
Norway (IFPI Norway)	Gold	25,000^{*}
Portugal (AFP)	2× Gold	40,000^{^}
Sweden	—	100,000
Switzerland (IFPI Switzerland)	Gold	25,000^{^}
United Kingdom (BPI)	Platinum	300,000^{^}
United States (RIAA)	4× Platinum	4,000,000^{^}
Summaries
Europe 1978-1985 sales	—	4,000,000
Worldwide	—	20,000,000
^{*} Sales figures based on certification alone.^{^} Shipments figures based on certification alone.^{‡} Sales+streaming figures based on certification alone.

== Awards ==
Grammy Awards

Grammy Awards for Breakfast in America
Year	Category
1980	Best Recording Package
1980	Best Engineered Album, Non-Classical

Grammy Award nominations for Breakfast in America
Year	Category
1980	Album of the Year
1980	Best Pop Performance by a Duo or Group with Vocals

== See also ==
- 1979 in music
- List of best-selling albums
- List of best-selling albums in France
- List of Billboard 200 number-one albums of 1979
- List of Canadian number-one albums of 1979
- List of number-one albums in Australia in 1979
- List of top 25 albums for 1979 in Australia
