= Rick Davies =

English musician (1944–2025)

- Davies in 1974.

Background information
- Born: Richard Davies; 22 July 1944; Swindon, Wiltshire, England
- Died: 6 September 2025 (aged 81) East Hampton, New York, US
- Genres: Progressive rock; pop rock; art rock; blues
- Occupations: Musician; singer; songwriter
- Instruments: Vocals; keyboards; harmonica; drums
- Years active: 1956–2022
- Labels: A&M; Rick Davies Productions
- Formerly of: Supertramp

Richard Davies (22 July 1944 – 6 September 2025) was an English musician best known as founder, vocalist and keyboardist of the rock band Supertramp. Davies was the band's only constant member and wrote or co-wrote songs including "Bloody Well Right", "Goodbye Stranger", "My Kind of Lady", "Cannonball", and "I'm Beggin' You". He was known for his rhythmic blues piano solos, jazz-tinged progressive rock compositions and cynical lyrics.

Beginning with the band's debut album Supertramp in 1970, Davies shared lead vocals with songwriting partner Roger Hodgson until the latter's departure in 1983, at which point he became the group's sole lead vocalist. Davies's voice was deeper than Hodgson's, and he usually employed a raspy baritone which stood in stark contrast to his bandmate's tenor, but he occasionally sang in a falsetto which superficially resembled Hodgson's vocals, such as on "Goodbye Stranger" and "My Kind of Lady".

== Life and career ==
=== Early life ===
Richard Davies was born in Swindon, Wiltshire, on 22 July 1944, to Betty and Dick Davies. Betty was a hairdresser and ran a salon, and Dick was a merchant seaman, who died in 1973. Rick went to Sanford Street School and, according to his mother: "Music was the only thing he was any good at, at school."

Davies's first musical stirrings were at the age of eight, when his parents gave him a second-hand radiogram which included a few records left by the previous owner. Among them were Drummin' Man by drumming legend Gene Krupa which, in Davies's own words, "hit like a thunderbolt". "I must have played it 2,000 times," he said. "That was it." A friend of the family made Rick a makeshift drum kit out of a biscuit tin, and at the age of 12 he joined the British Railways Staff Association Brass and Silver Jubilee Band as a snare drummer. In an interview in 2002 he said: "As a kid, I used to hear the drums marching along the street in England, in my home town, when there was some kind of parade, and it was the most fantastic sound to me. Then, eventually, I got some drums and I took lessons. I was serious about it... I figured if I could do that – I mean a real drummer, read music and play with big bands, rock bands, classical, Latin, and know what I was going to do – I would be in demand and my life was set... Eventually, I started fiddling with the keyboards, and that seemed to go over better than my drumming, for some reason. So you've gotta go with what people react to." He never had lessons for keyboards but, according to his mother, "taught himself most of what he knows about music".

By 1959 Davies's attention had been captured by rock and roll, and he joined a band called Vince and the Vigilantes. In 1962, while studying in the Art Department at Swindon College, he formed his own band, called Rick's Blues, and was now playing a Hohner electric piano instead of drums. For a time the band included Gilbert O'Sullivan on drums; he was later best man at Davies's wedding. In a March 1972 interview, O'Sullivan said "Rick had originally taught me how to play the drums and piano – in fact, he taught me everything about music." When his father became ill, Davies disbanded Rick's Blues, left college, and took a job as a welder at Square D, a firm making industrial control products and systems, which had a factory on the Cheney Manor Trading Estate in Swindon. Any hopes of an artistic career were temporarily put on ice.

In 1966 Davies became the organist for the Lonely Ones (best known for being one of Noel Redding's first bands, though Redding had left by the time Davies joined), who later changed their name to the Joint and recorded the soundtracks for a number of German films. He later confessed that he lied about his abilities to get into the group, admitting he could not actually play the organ at the time. While the band was in Munich, Davies met Dutch millionaire Stanley August Miesegaes, who offered to fund him if he started a new group.

=== Supertramp ===
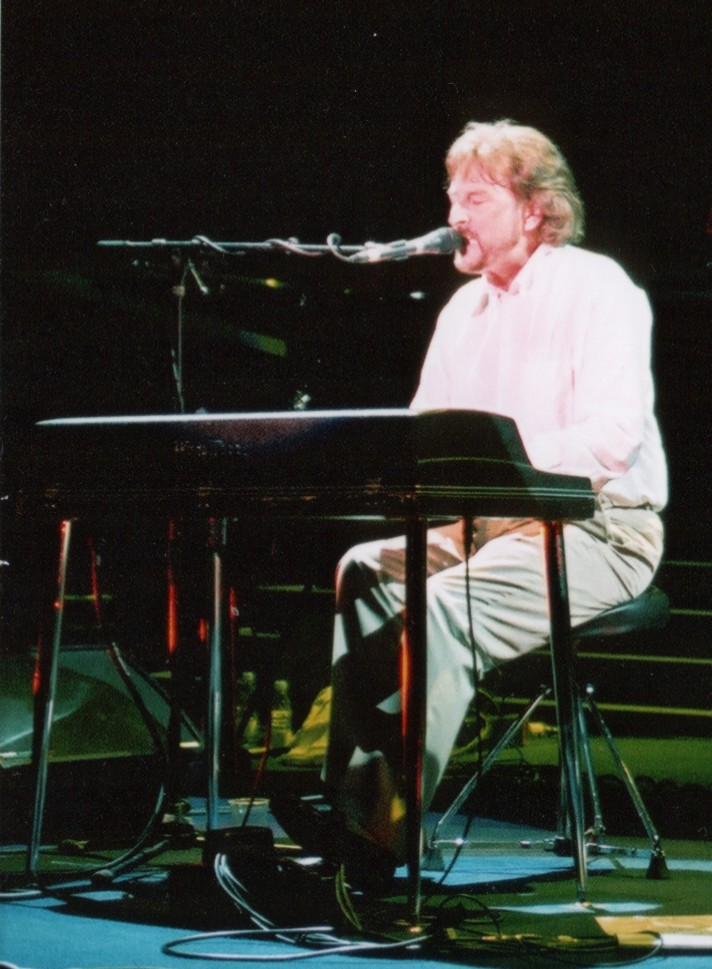
Davies in Dresden, Germany, in 2002

Davies decided to form a new band, and returned home from Switzerland to place an ad in the music magazine Melody Maker in August 1969. Roger Hodgson was auditioned and, despite their contrasting backgrounds – Davies's working-class upbringing and Hodgson's private school education – they struck up an instant rapport and began writing virtually all of their songs together. The band was initially called Daddy, but renamed Supertramp in January 1970.

Supertramp became one of the first acts to sign to the emerging UK branch of A&M Records and by the summer of 1970 they had recorded their first album, simply called Supertramp. Hodgson performed most of the lead vocals on this first effort, but by the time of their second album Indelibly Stamped Davies had stepped up as a singer, with Hodgson and him sharing lead vocal duties equally.

After five years with Davies and Hodgson as the mainstays of a continuously changing group, Supertramp settled into a stable line-up and recorded Crime of the Century, which finally brought them critical and commercial success when it was released in 1974. It reached number four on the UK Albums Chart. Though their singles were only moderately successful, their albums consistently scored high on the charts. Davies's relationship with Hodgson was changing and the two began writing most of their songs separately again, though they agreed to have them all credited to Davies/Hodgson by contract. Among the songs credited to both but actually written solely by Davies are the hits "Bloody Well Right" and "Goodbye Stranger".

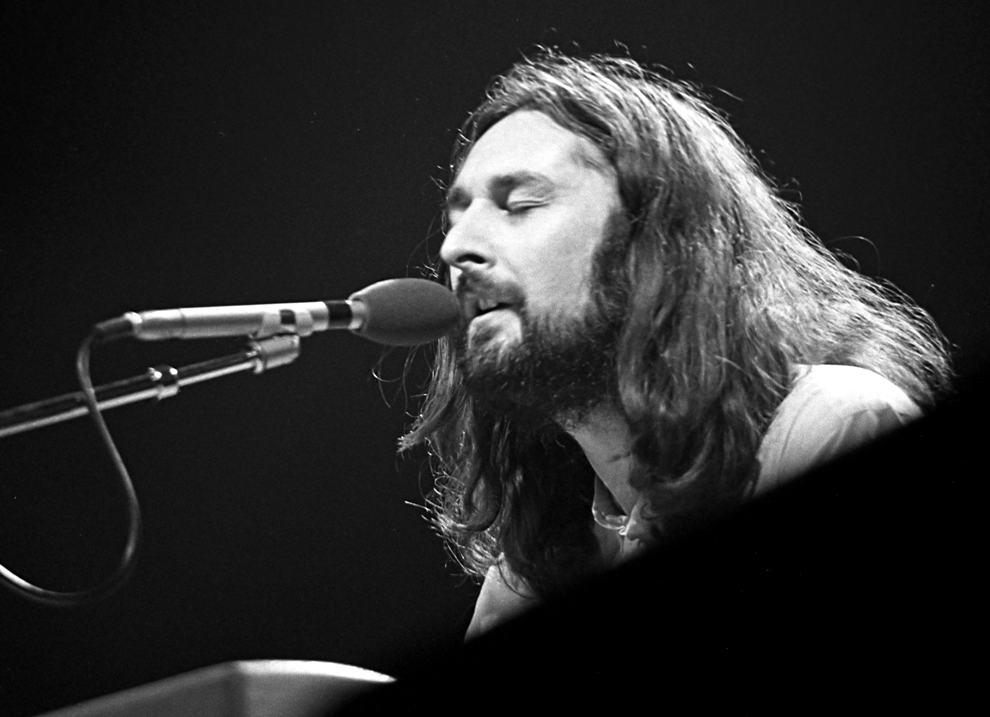
Davies performing in 1979

The group had relocated to the United States by 1977, where they recorded their best-selling album, Breakfast in America, from April 1978 to February 1979. Davies and Hodgson were observed by engineer Peter Henderson to be getting along "fantastically well and everyone was really happy" throughout the long months of recording and mixing. Davies is credited with writing the answering lyric in the second chorus of Hodgson's "The Logical Song". Released in March 1979, the album had more hit singles than their first five albums combined, reached number three in the UK, and topped the US Billboard 200 for six weeks. By 2010, it had sold over 20 million copies.

Hodgson quit Supertramp in 1983 and the group's last hit before his departure, "My Kind of Lady", featured little involvement from him as either a writer or performer. The song was a showcase for Davies's vocal range, with him singing in everything from a booming bass to a piercing falsetto to his natural raspy baritone. With Davies firmly at the helm, Supertramp returned to a more non-commercial, progressive rock-oriented sound with the album Brother Where You Bound and had another hit with "Cannonball". The band continued to tour and record for another five years before disbanding, with a mutual agreement between the members that Supertramp had run its course.

In 1997, during work on what would have been his first solo album, Davies decided to reform Supertramp. The band promptly returned to recording and touring, which yielded another two studio albums before they split again. Supertramp reunited in 2010 for their 70–10 tour. A 2015 tour was announced but ultimately cancelled due to Davies's health issues; he was battling multiple myeloma.

In late August 2018 Davies gave a rare interview in which he expressed that, for the most part, he had overcome his health problems and enjoyed playing music again. Davies later performed a few tracks as Ricky and the Rockets in a rehearsal/sound check at a bar, along with Supertramp's current members, but said it was unlikely that they would ever perform again as Supertramp. Ricky and the Rockets performed another show on 10 June 2022 at the Stephen Talkhouse in Amagansett, New York.

Starting with the band's first album in 1970, Davies shared lead vocals with Supertramp song-writing partner Roger Hodgson until the latter's departure in 1983, at which point he became the sole lead vocalist of the group. Davies's voice was deeper than Hodgson's, and he usually employed a raspy baritone which stood in stark contrast to his bandmate's tenor, but he occasionally sang in a falsetto which superficially resembled Hodgson's vocals, such as on "Goodbye Stranger" and "My Kind of Lady". He was the band's only constant member, and composed some of their best-known songs, including "Rudy", "Bloody Well Right", "Crime of the Century", "Ain't Nobody But Me", "From Now On", "Gone Hollywood", "Goodbye Stranger", "Just Another Nervous Wreck", "My Kind of Lady", "Cannonball" and "I'm Beggin' You".

In 1977 Davies and Hodgson reduced their 50% share of songwriting royalties, in order to give a share to bassist Dougie Thomson, saxophonist John Helliwell and drummer Bob Siebenberg, and to the band's manager. Hodgson said that the change was intended "to keep the band functioning and happy". This arrangement lasted until 2018; in 2021 Thomson, Helliwell and Siebenberg sued Hodgson and Davies. In 2023 Davies settled out of court and in August 2025 a U.S. appeals court ruled that Hodgson must share royalties with his ex-bandmates.

=== Personal life and death ===
On 9 July 1976, Davies married Suzanne, who would become Supertramp's manager in 1984.

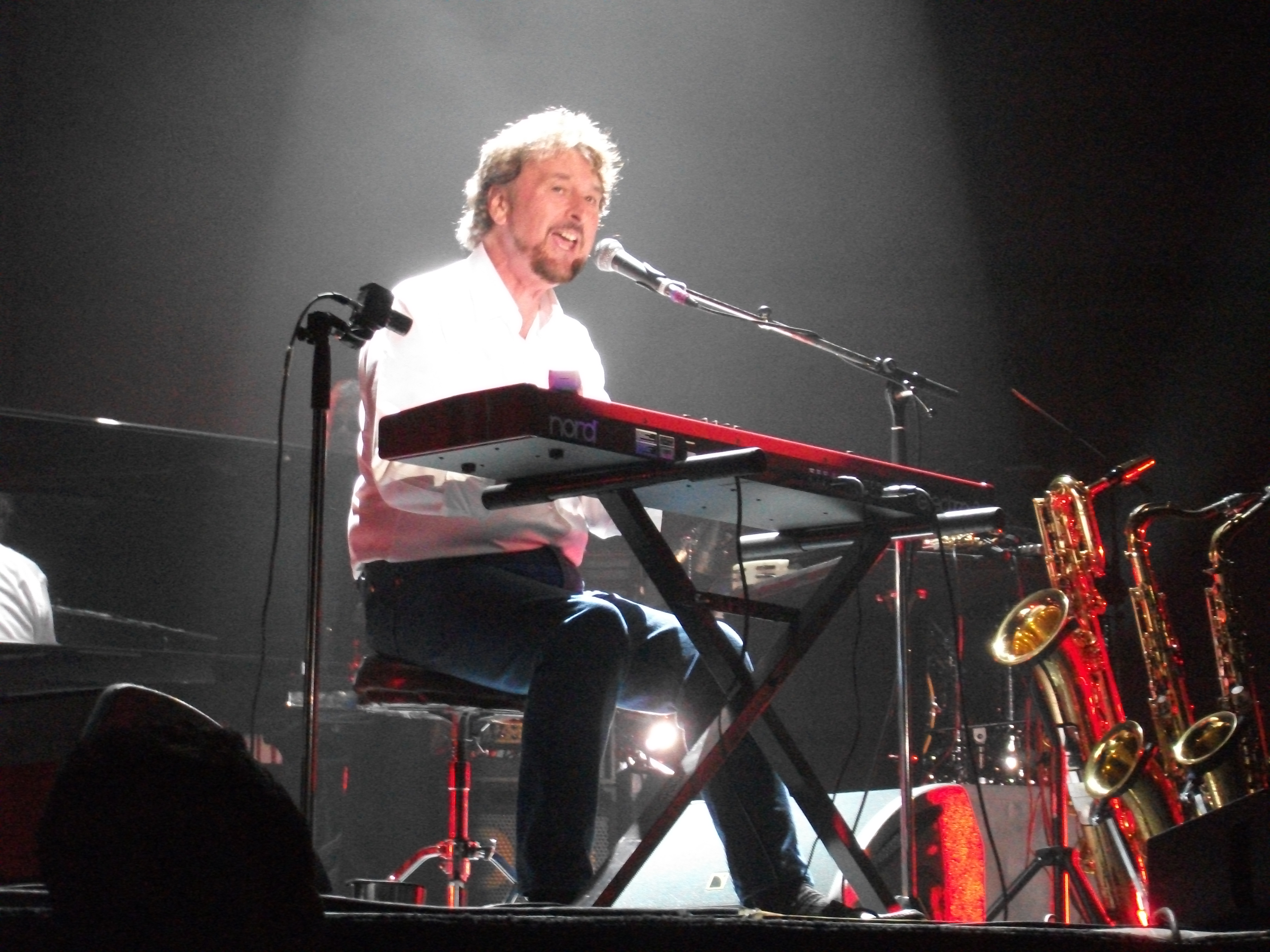
Davies in Bilbao, Spain, in 2010

Davies would travel from his home on Long Island, New York, every Christmas, to visit his mother Betty. She died in late 2008, at a nursing home in Stratton St Margaret and his last trip back was in January 2009 to organise a memorial service for her.

Davies owned Rick Davies Productions, which was the legal holder of the Supertramp trademark.

Davies was diagnosed with multiple myeloma and cancelled the band's 2015 tour. He died from complications of the disease on 6 September 2025, at the age of 81, at his home in East Hampton, New York.

In a statement issued after his death, the band said, "Beyond the stage, Rick was known for his warmth, resilience, and devotion to his wife Sue, with whom he shared over five decades". The band added in their statement, "Rick's music and legacy continue to inspire many and bears testament to the fact that great songs never die, they live on."

== Discography ==
=== Supertramp ===
- 1970: Supertramp
- 1971: Indelibly Stamped
- 1974: Crime of the Century
- 1975: Crisis? What Crisis?
- 1977: Even in the Quietest Moments...
- 1979: Breakfast in America
- 1980: Paris
- 1982: ...Famous Last Words...
- 1985: Brother Where You Bound
- 1987: Free as a Bird
- 1988: Live '88
- 1997: Some Things Never Change
- 1999: It Was The Best Of Times
- 2002: Slow Motion

=== Collaboration ===
- 1973: You and Me from Chick Churchill — with Roger Hodgson, Cozy Powell, Gary Pickford-Hopkins and Martin Barre.
