= Dougie Thomson =

British musician (born 1951)

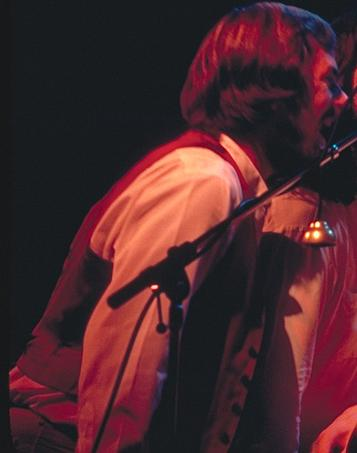
- Thomson in 1980

Background information
- Born: Douglas Campbell Thomson; 24 March 1951 (age 75); Glasgow, Scotland
- Genres: Rock; progressive pop
- Occupation: Musician
- Instrument: Bass guitar

Douglas 'Dougie' Campbell Thomson (born 24 March 1951) is a Scottish musician, born in Glasgow and raised in the Rutherglen area of the city. He was the bass guitarist of progressive rock band Supertramp from 1972 to 1988.

== Career ==
Thomson's musical career began in August 1969, when he joined a local Glaswegian band "The Beings". In September 1971 he joined The Alan Bown Set where he briefly worked with future Supertramp colleague, John Helliwell. In February 1972, Thomson auditioned for Supertramp, and ended up playing several gigs as a temporary stand-in.

In 1973, Thomson permanently joined Supertramp and helped in the business management with Dave Margereson; he also persuaded John Helliwell to join the band.

Thomson played with Supertramp on all of their most famous albums: Crime of the Century, Crisis? What Crisis?, Even in the Quietest Moments..., Breakfast in America, Paris, ...Famous Last Words..., Brother Where You Bound and Free as a Bird.

On the back cover of Breakfast in America was a photograph showing Thomson reading the Glasgow Herald.

Thomson was a member of Supertramp until the band's initial disbandment in 1988; He did not rejoin the band for their subsequent reunions. Dougie Thomson played a Music Man StingRay, a Rickenbacker 4001, a G&L L-2000, a Yamaha BB-1000 and a pair of Fender Precision and Jazz Basses during his time with Supertramp.

He has since become a publisher in the music business, creating Trinity Publishing, and worked with a Chicago, Illinois management company.

Thomson has four children, Laura, James, Kyle and Emma.

Thomson is the older brother of Ali Thomson.
