= Bob Siebenberg =

American drummer (born 1949)

- Also known as: Bob C. Benberg
- Born: Robert Layne Siebenberg; October 31, 1949 (age 76); Glendale, California, U.S.
- Genres: Rock; progressive rock; pop
- Occupations: Drummer; musician
- Instruments: Drums; percussion
- Formerly of: Supertramp

Robert Layne Siebenberg (born October 31, 1949), also known as Bob C. Benberg, is an American musician, best known as a member of British progressive rock band Supertramp, playing drums and percussion. He was the sole American in Supertramp's lineup, joining the band in 1973. His son, Jesse, joined Supertramp at the time of the release of the live album It Was the Best of Times (live; 1999).

In 1985, Siebenberg released a solo album called Giants in Our Own Room (and credited to "Siebenberg"), where he sings lead on half of the songs and also plays keyboards and drums. Joining Siebenberg on this record were Scott Gorham of Thin Lizzy fame (Gorham was Siebenberg's brother-in-law from 1969 to 2000), Steve Farris of Mr. Mister, Procol Harum drummer B. J. Wilson (who played on the final track), bassist Kerry Hatch of Oingo Boingo, and Supertramp bandmate John Helliwell. An old friend, Derek Beauchemin, joined in to co-write and play keyboards.

Prior to joining Supertramp, Siebenberg was a member of pub rock band Bees Make Honey as well as RHS, an American band. He was in a band called "Heads Up" which released the 1989 album The Long Shot. Joining Siebenberg were his writing partner Dennis O'Donnell, Mark Hart, Brad Cole, John Helliwell, Marty Walsh and again, Scott Gorham on guitar.

In 1989, Siebenberg composed the original music for Sierra On-Line's video game Space Quest III. He endorses Drum Workshop drums, pedals and hardware, Paiste cymbals, Remo heads and Regal Tip drumsticks. In the 1970s, he used Ludwig drums.

== Discography ==
Bees Make Honey

- Music Every Night (1973)
- Back on Track (2003) – double album compilation

Supertramp

- Every album, 1974–present (see Supertramp discography)

Heads Up

- The Long Shot (1989)

Solo

- Giants in Our Own Room (1985)
- Glendale River (2015)

Appearances

- Private Parts (1972) by Peter Straker
- Solo in Soho (1981) by Philip Lynott
