= Babaji (song) =

- European single cover

Single by Supertramp

from the album Even in the Quietest Moments...
- B-side: "From Now On"
- Released: 4 November 1977
- Recorded: 3 November 1976
- Studio: Caribou Ranch (Nederland, Colorado)
- Genre: Progressive rock
- Length: 4:49
- Label: A&M
- Songwriters: Rick Davies, Roger Hodgson
- Producer: Supertramp

Supertramp singles chronology
"Give a Little Bit" (1977)	"Babaji" (1977)	"The Logical Song" (1979)

"Babaji" is a song by British rock band Supertramp, written by Roger Hodgson and also credited to other band member Rick Davies. First released on their 1977 album Even in the Quietest Moments..., it was subsequently released in Europe and in Australia as the follow-up single to "Give a Little Bit".

== Lyrics and music ==
Hodgson wrote "Babaji" in honour of Mahavatar Babaji, whom he regarded as a Christ- or Krishna-like figure, or even a manifestation of the spirit or force of God. According to Supertramp drummer Bob Siebenberg, "Babaji is like Roger's light of life" and "Roger's guiding light sort of guy." The lyrics reflect this in lines such as "All my life I felt that you were listening/Watching for ways to help me stay in tune" and "Babaji, oh won't you come to me/Won't you help me face the music." Music critic Dale Winnitowy described the song's religious content as "George Harrison-like." The lyrics emphasise the need for effort in order to attain enlightenment from the search for Babaji.

Other band members were less enthralled with the song's spiritual subject matter. Keyboardist Rick Davies told NME that "Personally, I decry it. I'd sooner remain anonymous than become religious. I might fight with Roger on this next album about that ... It's not right. You've got people in the band who couldn't give a damn." Saxophonist John Helliwell stated that "when [Hodgson] wrote about Christ or Babaji—whoever that is—we just wished he would sing about something else." Helliwell also noted that "Rick was pretty down to earth whereas Roger was a bit more mentally…not a higher plane, but spacey – he had spiritual yearnings."

According to Siebenberg, Hodgson "came up with the different bits of time" that he played on the song. He said that of the songs on Even in the Quietest Moments... "Babaji" took the longest to work out the drum parts because everything had to be very precise, including which parts were played on which drum or bell.

The Rough Guide to Rock critic Lance Phillips described the song as a progressive rock song and described the theme as "lost-little-boy spiritualism."

== Reception ==
Record World said that "strings and electronic undercurrents create an exceptionally colorful tapestry which is topped off by an exemplary vocal blend." Music critic Mark Moran described "Babaji", as well as "Give a Little Bit", as having a "leisurely pace and gentle melody" which Helliwell attributed to the band's growing maturity. Steve Wosahla of the Messenger-Press similarly acknowledged those two songs as representing the "more 'subtle' approach the band had hoped to incorporate" into Even in the Quietest Moments..., calling them "excellent complements" to the harder songs on the album. Brandon Sun critic Graham Hicks felt that the song "could have been a classic" but falls short due to the non-electric piano being unable to achieve the "light, strident" notes Hicks believes the song calls for, and due to "unimaginative and repetitive" percussion and bass guitar playing. Sounds critic Geoff Barton found "Babaji" to be "less than enthralling." AllMusic critic Stephen Thomas Erlewine described it as "a pseudo-spiritual moment that falls from the pop mark."

"Babaji" was later released on the 1992 compilation album The Very Best of Supertramp 2.
