= Roger Hodgson discography =

- Studio albums: 3
- Live albums: 3
- Singles: 6

The discography of English musician Roger Hodgson includes 3 studio albums, 3 live albums, and 6 singles.

== Albums ==
=== Studio albums ===
Title	Album details	Peak chart positions										Certifications
Title	Album details	AUS	CAN	FRA	GER	NLD	NOR	SWE	SWI	UK	US	Certifications
In the Eye of the Storm	Released: 1 October 1984; Label: A&M	23	15	—	20	19	14	41	6	70	46	MC: Platinum
Hai Hai	Released: 9 October 1987; Label: A&M	88	42	—	—	52	20	—	16	—	163	
Open the Door	Released: 9 May 2000; Label: Epic	—	—	30	74	—	—	—	33	—	—	

=== Live albums ===
List of albums, with selected chart positions
Title	Album details	Peak chart positions			Certifications
Title	Album details	GER	SWI	UK Vid.	Certifications
Rites of Passage	Released: 1997; Label: Unichord Productions	34	46	—	
Take the Long Way Home	Released: 2006; Label: DEP/Universal Canada; Format: DVD	—	—	17	BVMI: Gold (Video); MC: Platinum (DVD)
Classics Live	Released: 2010; Label: Roger Hodgson Music	—	—	—	

== Singles ==
Title	Year	Peak chart positions						Album
Title	Year	AUS	CAN	NLD	SWI	US	US Rock Air.	Album
"Had a Dream (Sleeping with the Enemy)"	1984	21	29	33	27	48	11	In the Eye of the Storm
"In Jeopardy"	1984	—	—	—	—	—	30	In the Eye of the Storm
"Lovers in the Wind"	1984	—	—	—	—	—	—	In the Eye of the Storm
"London"	1987	—	—	—	—	—	—	Hai Hai
"You Make Me Love You"	1987	—	44	—	—	—	38	Hai Hai
"Hungry"	2000	—	—	—	—	—	—	Open the Door

== Other recordings ==
Year	Songs	Album	Comments
1969	"Mr. Boyd", "Imagine"	n.a.	Hodgson wrote both songs when he was in the band Argosy.
1994	"Walls"	Talk	Hodgson co-wrote this Yes song.
1998	"The Elements", "The Will of God"	Excalibur: la légende des Celtes	Hodgson contributed these songs to the soundtrack.
2000	"The Moon Says Hello"	Mayo Longo	Hodgson sang lead vocals on this track collaborating with Carlos Núñez (Galicia).
