= Take the Long Way Home—Live in Montreal =

Video by Roger Hodgson
- Released: 28 August 2006 (Canada)
- Recorded: 6 June 2006
- Genre: Rock
- Label: DEP/Universal Canada (Canada); Eagle Vision (rest of world)

Take the Long Way Home—Live in Montreal is Roger Hodgson's first DVD. It was released in 2006, and went platinum in only seven weeks. The DVD hit #1 in Quebec for three months, went to #1 in all of Canada and reached double platinum status.

The DVD includes a 75-minute solo concert filmed live at Place des Arts in Montreal, Quebec on 6 June 2006. In addition to the concert, it contains over 90 minutes of bonus features with previously unreleased solo and orchestra performance footage, exclusive interviews, behind the scenes footage, film from sound check, fan interviews, photo gallery, and various song clips from Hodgson's repertoire.

The DVD was given a worldwide release in September 2007 on Eagle Vision with a new cover and additional material.

== Track listing ==
1. "Take the Long Way Home"
2. "Give a Little Bit"
3. "Lovers in the Wind"
4. "Hide in Your Shell"
5. "Oh Brother"
6. "The Logical Song"
7. "Easy Does It"
8. "Sister Moonshine"
9. "Love Is a Thousand Times"
10. "Breakfast in America"
11. "Don't Leave me Now"
12. "Dreamer"
13. "It's Raining Again"
14. "School"
15. "Two of Us"
16. "Give a Little Bit"
17. "Sister Moonshine(fade out)"

=== Bonus material ===
1. "Even in the Quietest Moments"
2. "Dreamer w/Orchestra"

=== Extra sneak previews ===
1. "The Logical Song w/Orchestra"
2. "Fool's Overture w/Orchestra"

== Musicians ==
- Roger Hodgson: lead vocals, piano, keyboards, acoustic guitar
- Aaron MacDonald: saxophone, keyboards, melodica, backing vocals

== Trivia ==
- Reached #1 in Quebec and #5 in Canada on the DVD charts.
- This was part of Hodgson's first Canadian tour in 23 years.

== Certifications ==
Region	Certification	Certified units/sales
Canada (Music Canada)	Platinum	10,000^{^}
Germany (BVMI)	Gold	25,000^{^}
^{^} Shipments figures based on certification alone.
