= Paris (Supertramp album) =

1980 live album by Supertramp

Live album by Supertramp
- Released: 26 September 1980
- Recorded: 29 November 1979
- Venues: Pavillon de Paris, Paris, France
- Genres: Progressive rock, pop rock, art rock
- Length: 89:42 (original album); 121:22 (expanded edition)
- Label: A&M
- Producers: Peter Henderson, Russel Pope

Supertramp chronology
Breakfast in America (1979)	Paris (1980)	…Famous Last Words… (1982)

Singles from Paris
- 1. "Dreamer" Released: September 1980 (US); 2. "Take the Long Way Home" Released: September 1980 (UK); 3. "Breakfast in America" Released: November 1980 (US)

Professional ratings
Review scores
Source	Rating
AllMusic	2/5 stars
Billboard	(unrated)
Encyclopedia of Popular Music	2/5 stars
The Rolling Stone Album Guide	2.5/5 stars

Paris is a live album by the British rock band Supertramp, released in 1980. It was recorded on Supertramp's Breakfast in America tour in Paris, France, with most of the tracks taken from a 29 November 1979 show at the Pavillon de Paris, a venue which was once a slaughterhouse. The album was originally going to be called Roadworks. Paris reached number 8 on the Billboard 200 in late 1980 and went Gold immediately, while the live version of "Dreamer" hit the US Top 20.

== Background and recording ==
According to Roger Hodgson, Supertramp had several reasons to record a live album at the time, including a desire to introduce their pre-Breakfast in America works to US listeners and a mutual sentiment that some of their songs were pulled off better live than in the studio. However, he admits that the chief purpose of the album was to buy time; the band was under pressure to produce a suitable follow-up to the immense success of Breakfast in America, and needed to get off the treadmill of touring and recording for a while in order to consider their direction for such an album. Taking such a breather meant the next studio album wouldn't be finished until 1981 at the earliest, and so something was needed "to fill the gap."

Using the band's mobile studio, a number of shows in Canada and throughout Europe were recorded. However, when Pete Henderson and Russel Pope presented the band with unlabelled cassettes containing rough mixes of these recordings, and the members voted on their favourite tracks, the majority of votes coincidentally fell on recordings from the 29 November show at the Pavilion. A few tracks were taken from other concerts during the band's stay in Paris, and studio overdubs were also added, chiefly for the vocals and John Helliwell's organ. However, Helliwell contended that the amount of overdubbing was minimal compared to most live albums of the time: "A lot of people, when they make a live album, just keep the drums and bass and redo everything else." Filmmaker Derek Burbidge shot the concerts in 16 mm film, missing only five songs ("A Soapbox Opera", "You Started Laughing", "From Now On", "Ain't Nobody But Me" and "Downstream") to lower expenses and give the camera crew some rest. A&M Records requested music videos out of three songs, "Dreamer", "The Logical Song" and "Asylum". Peter Clifton edited them along with Sarah Legon, and even extended his work to ten songs. However, the studio never sent an approval, so Clifton retreated back to his Sydney home and brought the negatives along to Australia.

The album's set list contains almost all of the 1974 Crime of the Century (except for "If Everyone Was Listening"), three songs from Crisis? What Crisis? (1975), two from Even in the Quietest Moments (1977), three from Breakfast in America (1979) plus "You Started Laughing", the B-side to the track "Lady" from Crisis? What Crisis?. The hit "Give a Little Bit" was played on the tour but not included because, according to Hodgson, "we were shocked when we listened back to the live tapes to find how bad all the versions were. There just wasn't one version that we felt that we wanted to put on the album." Other songs that were on the tour's set list but not on the album are "Goodbye Stranger", "Even in the Quietest Moments", "Downstream", "Child of Vision" and "Another Man's Woman". All of these tracks, including "Give a Little Bit", later showed up on the second live disc included in the deluxe anniversary edition of Breakfast in America and on the 2-CD/DVD set Live in Paris '79.

== Remastering and DVD release ==
Live in Paris '79

Video by Supertramp
- Released: 2012
- Recorded: 1 December 1979
- Venues: Pavillon de Paris, Paris, France
- Genres: Progressive rock, pop rock, art rock
- Length: 94:44
- Label: Eagle Rock Entertainment
- Producers: Peter Henderson, Russel Pope, Peter Clifton

Supertramp chronology
70-10 Tour (2010)	Live in Paris '79 (2012)

Professional ratings
Review scores
Source	Rating
AllMusic	3.5/5 stars
Classic Rock	4.5/5 stars

In July 2006, the original master tapes of the album were rediscovered in the Northern California barn of the band's drummer Bob Siebenberg, along with video footage. The tapes were sent to Cups 'N Strings Studios in Woodland Hills, California, for digital remastering. The tapes were initially in bad technical shape, but were successfully transferred to a digital format.

In 2010, Clifton was contacted to finish editing the initial three videos, aiming to later release a concert film out of the Paris concert. The footage was delivered to Roger Hodgson before a concert in Sydney. Once Supertramp manager Dave Margereson and Eagle Rock Entertainment offered to cover the post-production costs, Clifton worked on finishing the film, doing his initial work in Australia. By the time he moved to London to conclude the project, Clifton found out his original idea to feature heavily footage of Paris, adding a story akin to his work in The Song Remains the Same, was nixed by the band, who edited most of what he had done without consent to instead showcase more of the group. The sound was remixed by Peter Henderson and Supertramp's original sound engineer Russel Pope from the original multi-tracks.

The concert film was released on 27 August 2012 under the title Live in Paris '79, with editions in both DVD and Blu-ray Disc. Hodgson would later express his disapproval with the finished project, saying the rest of the band made most decisions regarding the DVD without asking his input and avoiding giving correct songwriting credit to himself or Davies. The DVD was repackaged in 2015 with the full show on two CDs and correct songwriting credit on the rear packaging.

== Track listing ==
=== 1980 release ===
All tracks are written by Rick Davies and Roger Hodgson.

Side one
No.	Title	Length
1.	"School"	5:41
2.	"Ain't Nobody But Me"	5:24
3.	"The Logical Song"	3:56
4.	"Bloody Well Right"	3:42

Side two
No.	Title	Length
1.	"Breakfast in America"	2:57
2.	"You Started Laughing"	4:02
3.	"Hide in Your Shell"	6:54
4.	"From Now On"	7:06

Side three
No.	Title	Length
1.	"Dreamer"	3:44
2.	"Rudy"	7:08
3.	"A Soapbox Opera"	4:51
4.	"Asylum"	6:51

Side four
No.	Title	Length
1.	"Take the Long Way Home"	4:57
2.	"Fool's Overture"	10:57
3.	"Two of Us"	1:25
4.	"Crime of the Century"	6:32

=== 2012 deluxe set ===
All tracks are written by Rick Davies and Roger Hodgson.

No.	Title	Length
1.	"School"	5:54
2.	"Ain't Nobody But Me"	5:12
3.	"The Logical Song"	3:43
4.	"Goodbye Stranger"	6:41
5.	"Breakfast in America"	2:51
6.	"Bloody Well Right"	6:14
7.	"Hide in Your Shell"	6:58
8.	"From Now On"	6:56
9.	"Child of Vision"	7:23
10.	"Even in the Quietest Moments"	4:50
11.	"You Started Laughing"	3:56
12.	"A Soapbox Opera"	5:01
13.	"Asylum"	6:46
14.	"Downstream"	3:27
15.	"Give a Little Bit"	4:25
16.	"Dreamer"	3:23
17.	"Rudy"	6:54
18.	"Take the Long Way Home"	4:38
19.	"Another Man's Woman"	7:26
20.	"Fool's Overture"	10:53
21.	"Two of Us"	1:50
22.	"Crime of the Century"	6:01

== Personnel ==
- Rick Davies
- Roger Hodgson
- John Helliwell
- Dougie Thomson
- Bob Siebenberg (as Bob C. Benberg)

== Production ==
- Producers: Peter Henderson, Russel Pope
- Engineers: Bernie Grundman, Peter Henderson, Russel Pope
- Mixing: Bernie Grundman
- Mastering: Bernie Grundman
- Re-mastering: Greg Calbi, Jay Messina
- Production manager: "Spy" Matthews
- Lighting: Ken Allardyce, Tony Shepherd
- Monitors: Ian Lloyd "Biggles" Bigsley
- Sound System: Norman Hall, David Farmiloe, Mick Berg, Chris "Smoother" Smyth
- Lighting System: Patrick O'Doherty, Roger Grose, Tam Smith
- Stage System: Patrick Ampe, Van Annonson, Steve Dabbs
- Piano technician: Edd Kolakowski
- Projection: Gus Thomson
- Rigging: George Packer, Jade Dearling
- Art direction: Mike Doud
- Design: Mike Fink
- Cover illustration: Cindy Marsh
- Photography: Mark Hanauer, Steve Smith
- Liner notes: David Margereson

2002 A&M reissue:
The 2002 A&M Records reissue was mastered from the original master tapes by Greg Calbi and Jay Messina at Sterling Sound, New York, 2002. The reissue was supervised by Bill Levenson with art direction by Vartan and design by Mike Diehl, with production coordination by Beth Stempel.

== Charts ==
=== Album ===
==== Weekly charts ====
Chart (1980–1981)	Position
Australian Albums (Kent Music Report)	3
Austrian Albums (Ö3 Austria)	7
Canada Top Albums/CDs (RPM)	11
Dutch Albums (Album Top 100)	2
French Albums (SNEP)	9
German Albums (Offizielle Top 100)	5
Italian Albums (Musica e dischi)	18
New Zealand Albums (RMNZ)	1
Norwegian Albums (VG-lista)	6
Swedish Albums (Sverigetopplistan)	12
UK Albums (Official Charts)	7
US Billboard 200	8

==== Year-end charts ====
Chart (1981)	Position
German Albums (Offizielle Top 100)	38

=== DVD ===
Chart (2012)	Peak position
Australian Music DVDs Chart	17
Belgian (Flanders) Music DVDs Chart	6
Belgian (Wallonia) Music DVDs Chart	1
Danish Music DVDs Chart	10
Dutch Music DVDs Chart	1
Irish Music DVDs Chart	5
Spanish Music DVDs Chart	5
Swedish Music DVDs Chart	3
Swiss Music DVDs Chart	1
UK Music Videos Chart	5

== Certifications ==
Region	Certification	Certified units/sales
Canada (Music Canada)	Platinum	100,000^{^}
France (SNEP)	Gold	100,000^{*}
Germany (BVMI)	Gold	250,000^{^}
New Zealand (RMNZ)	Platinum	15,000^{^}
United Kingdom (BPI)	Gold	100,000^{^}
United States (RIAA)	Gold	250,000^{^}
^{*} Sales figures based on certification alone.^{^} Shipments figures based on certification alone.
