= Dreamer (Supertramp song) =

1974 single from Supertramp

Single by Supertramp

from the album Crime of the Century
- B-side: "Bloody Well Right"
- Released: 1 November 1974 (UK) (Note: release date from the A&M records press release)
- Recorded: 1974
- Genre: Progressive pop; art pop
- Length: 3:33
- Label: A&M
- Songwriters: Rick Davies, Roger Hodgson
- Producers: Supertramp, Ken Scott

Supertramp singles chronology
"Land Ho" (1974)	"Dreamer" (1974)	"Bloody Well Right" (1974)

Official audio
- "Dreamer" on YouTube

"Dreamer" (Roger Hodgson)
33 second clip from Roger Hodgson's song, "Dreamer."

"Dreamer"
- Live version single picture sleeve

Single by Supertramp

from the album Paris
- B-side: "You Started Laughing"
- Released: September 1980 (US)
- Recorded: November 1979
- Venue: Pavillon de Paris
- Genre: Progressive rock
- Length: 3:15
- Label: A&M
- Songwriters: Rick Davies, Roger Hodgson
- Producers: Peter Henderson, Russel Pope

Supertramp singles chronology
"Take the Long Way Home" (1979)	"Dreamer" (1980)	"Breakfast in America" (1980)

Audio
- "Dreamer" (Live) on YouTube

"Dreamer" is a song by the British rock band Supertramp from their 1974 album Crime of the Century. Released as a single, it peaked at number 13 on the UK singles chart in February 1975. In 1980, it appeared on the band's live album Paris. This live version was also released as a single and hit number 15 on the US charts, number 36 in the Dutch Top 40, and number one on the Canadian Singles Chart. When "Dreamer" had been released in 1974, its B-side "Bloody Well Right" was more popular in North America, leading it to chart instead at No. 35 in the US and No. 49 in Canada, with "Dreamer" only charting in Canada at No. 75. "Dreamer" also appeared on Roger Hodgson's album Classics Live, recorded on tour in 2010.

== Background ==
"Dreamer" was composed by Roger Hodgson on his Wurlitzer piano at his mother's house when he was 19 years old. At that time he recorded a demo of the song using vocals, Wurlitzer, and improvised percussion. Hodgson recalled, "I was excited – it was the first time I laid hands on a Wurlitzer." Hodgson also said:

I was sitting at the keyboard in my mother's house and it was something that just flew out of me. I just sang words and the words that came out were very close to what’s in the final song. I was banging boxes and light shades and I created this magical demo.

Supertramp cut their own recording of the song in imitation of this early demo.

The band performed the song on the BBC's music series The Old Grey Whistle Test in 1974, during which John Helliwell can be seen playing the rim of a wine glass on top of his keyboard to achieve a certain sound effect.

== Reception ==
Cashbox called it a "funny little song" and said that it "maintains the group's stance on instrumentation, lyrics and structure while offering a great deal of commercial potential." Record World said that "The song is memorable, the style right for a mass audience." Record World later said that "the cute vocals and swirling, pulsating keyboards are contagious." Ultimate Classic Rock critic Nick DeRiso rated it as Supertramp's 10th best song, calling it a "diaphanous slice of sentiment" in which it became apparent that Supertramp had found its own "art-pop sound."

In 2017 Gary Graff of Billboard rated it as Supertramp's all-time greatest song, praising its twists and hooks. Reviewing the live version in 1980, Billboard said that "Dreamer" has a "sweet pop melody, clear vocals and bubbly keyboards."

Hodgson rated it as one of the top 10 songs he ever wrote.

== Track listings ==
=== 1974: 7-inch single ===
Side one

1. "Dreamer" – 3:33 (Written by Roger Hodgson)

Side two

1. "Bloody Well Right" – 4:26 (Written by Rick Davies)

=== 1980: 7-inch single ===
==== US version ====
Side one

1. "Dreamer" (Live) – 3:15 (Hodgson)

Side two

1. "From Now On" (Live) – 6:44 (Davies)

==== European version ====
Side one

1. "Dreamer" (Live) – 3:15 (Hodgson)

Side two

1. "You Started Laughing" (Live) – 3:50 (Davies)

== Personnel ==
- Roger Hodgson – Wurlitzer electronic piano, lead and backing vocals
- Rick Davies – Wurlitzer electronic piano, Hammond organ, lead and backing vocals
- John Helliwell – glass harp, backing vocals
- Bob Siebenberg – drums, glockenspiel
- Dougie Thomson – bass guitar

== Charts ==
=== Studio version ===
Chart (1975/78)	Peak position
Australia (Kent Music Report)	47
Canada Top Singles (RPM)	75
New Zealand (Recorded Music NZ)	34
UK Singles (Official Charts)	13

=== Live version ===
Chart (1980)	Peak position
Australia (Kent Music Report)	39
Canada Top Singles (RPM)	1
France (IFOP)	44
Netherlands (Single Top 100)	31
US Billboard Hot 100	15
