= Crime of the Century (album) =

Studio album by Supertramp
- Released: 25 October 1974
- Recorded: February–June 1974
- Studios: Trident, London; Ramport, London; Scorpio Sound, London
- Genres: Art rock; progressive rock; pop
- Length: 44:10
- Label: A&M
- Producers: Ken Scott; Supertramp

Supertramp chronology
Indelibly Stamped (1971)	Crime of the Century (1974)	Crisis? What Crisis? (1975)

Singles from Crime of the Century
- 1. "Dreamer / Bloody Well Right" Released: 1 November 1974

Crime of the Century is the third studio album by the British rock band Supertramp, released on 25 October 1974, by A&M Records. Crime of the Century was Supertramp's commercial breakthrough in many countries, most notably in the UK, Canada and Germany where it peaked in the Top 5 while also making the Top 20 in Australia and France. It was the band's first album to chart in the United States, reaching No. 38 on the Billboard 200. The single "Dreamer" reached No. 13 on the UK singles chart, but listeners in the United States preferred its B-side, "Bloody Well Right", which peaked at No. 35 on the Billboard Hot 100. "School" was another popular track, particularly on album rock-oriented radio stations. The album was eventually certified Gold in the US in 1977 after the release of Even in the Quietest Moments.... In Canada, it was eventually certified Diamond (sales of one million copies). The album was Supertramp's first to feature drummer Bob Siebenberg (at the time credited as Bob C. Benberg), saxophone and clarinet player and vocalist John Helliwell, bassist Dougie Thomson, and co-producer Ken Scott. The album has received critical acclaim, including its inclusion in Rolling Stone's "50 Greatest Prog Rock Albums of All Time".

The album's dedication reads "To Sam", which is a nickname for Stanley August Miesegaes, the Dutch millionaire who supported the band financially from 1969 to 1972.

== Background and recording ==
"Crime of the Century" by Supertramp
Supertramp brought progressive rock's sophisticated arrangements and conceptual lyrics into a pop context.

After the commercial failure of their first two albums and an equally unsuccessful tour, it looked like the end of Supertramp. However, Rick Davies and Roger Hodgson revitalized the band, recruiting drummer Bob C. Benberg, woodwinds player and backing vocalist John Helliwell, and bassist Dougie Thomson. Their record label, A&M, in particular A&R man Dave Margereson (who would become their manager for the next ten years), sent this new line-up to a seventeenth-century farm in west Dorset to rehearse their next album together.

The album was recorded at several studios, including Trident Studios and Ramport Studios (owned by the Who), with co-producer Ken Scott. While recording the album, Davies and Hodgson recorded approximately 42 demo songs, from which only 8 were chosen to appear on the album.

Six tracks were first recorded for the soundtrack of Tony Klinger's 1971 film Extremes "about British youth, lifestyles and drug addiction". Several other tracks appeared on later albums such as Crisis? What Crisis? and ...Famous Last Words....

Due to a contractual agreement, all the songs are credited jointly to the two writers; however, some of the songs were written individually. Scott commented that Davies and Hodgson "were very, very different personalities. Those differing personalities made the music sound the way it did." "Asylum", "Rudy" and "Bloody Well Right" were written by Davies, "If Everyone Was Listening", and "Hide in Your Shell" were written by Hodgson, and "Dreamer", "School" and "Crime of the Century" are all Davies/Hodgson collaborations.

Hodgson remarked of "Hide in Your Shell": "I was 23 when I wrote that song, confused about life and like a lot of people are at that age, trying to hide my insecurities. I’ve always been able to express my innermost feelings more openly in song and 'Hide in Your Shell' came to me at a time when I was feeling very lonely – lonely both in life and within the band – with no one who shared my spiritual quest."

"Dreamer" was composed by Hodgson on his Wurlitzer piano at his mother's house when he was 19 years old. At that time he recorded a demo of the song using vocals, Wurlitzer, and banging cardboard boxes for percussion. Hodgson recalled: "I was excited – it was the first time I laid hands on a Wurlitzer." Supertramp cut their own recording of the song in imitation of this early demo, though they had difficulty recreating the song, and so put the demo tape on the multitrack machine, and played to the demo.

Another of Hodgson's philosophical musings, "If Everyone Was Listening", was inspired by the As You Like It adage "All the world’s a stage, and all the men and women merely players". According to Entertainment Weekly, the message of the song is, "Not knowing what’s going on in everyone’s mind is just another form of not being in control. The fear comes not from the absence of knowledge of another person’s thought process, but rather from confronting the fact that we have no control over anything." The song would later provide the title track for Michael Ball's 2014 album of the same name.

The album was named after the final song, "Crime of the Century", which the band members felt was the strongest song on the album. The phrase “crime of the century” is a sensationalist trope which has been applied to various notorious crimes in history. Its application to more than one crime per century speaks to its hyperbolic nature. Shortly after his departure from Supertramp, Hodgson commented: "I've had more people come up to me and say that that song touched them more deeply than any other. That song really came together when we were living together at Southcombe Farm, Thorncombe, and just eating, sleeping, and breathing the ideas for the album. The song just bounced between Rick and I for so many weeks before it finally took form."

Hodgson describes "School" as "my song basically" but admits that Davies wrote both the piano solo and a good deal of the lyrics. Interviewed by Jeff Parets of Acoustic Storm in 2010, Hodgson confirmed that the song was based on his experience at boarding school and said of the girl's scream: "Everything, especially that scream that you're talking about just before the band comes in, does represent a lot... I mean, you know, school is a wonderful place. Obviously, it's a school playground but that scream does represent a lot more."

On the In the Studio with Redbeard episode devoted to the album, Hodgson stated that "Rudy" was the character on the album and was seen as somewhat autobiographical of Davies' life at the time. The sound of the train in "Rudy" was recorded at London Paddington station, while the crowd noises in the song were taken from Leicester Square.

Hodgson and Davies both stated that communication within the group was at a peak during the recording of this album, while drummer Siebenberg stated that he thought it was this album on which the band hit its "artistic peak".

Crime of the Century deals loosely with themes of loneliness and mental stability. Davies consciously linked the opening track "School" to "Bloody Well Right" with the line "So you think your schooling is phoney", and according to Hodgson, any unifying thread beyond that was left to the listener's imagination.

== Artwork ==
The photograph for the cover was Paul Wakefield's first album work. A&M Records' art director Fabio Nicoli invited Wakefield to the studio where the band were recording and had him read the lyrics. With the album title already chosen, Wakefield started asking himself "what an appropriate sentence could be for 'the crime of the century'" and combined it with a line from the song "Asylum": "when they haunt me and taunt me in my cage." One of his ideas, a prison cell window floating in space with a person silently screaming through the bars, was approved by the band, and when Wakefield started to develop the idea, he reduced the prisoner to just hands clutching the bars, "a resignation to fate that the other didn’t have. It felt like there would be no reprieve." A friend made the set of polished aluminum bars and welded it to a stand, and underneath it Wakefield's twin brother grabbed the bars, with his hands whitened with stage make-up. Through multiple exposure, Wakefield shot 12 pictures on transparency film, which he then combined with a back-lit starscape, that was actually a black card sheet filled with holes in a darkened studio. Half of the resulting pictures had the expected result. The back cover photograph, featuring band members in their underwear holding dress suits and top hats, was originally made when the album cover was meant to be a gatefold.

== Reception ==
Professional ratings
Retrospective reviews
Review scores
Source	Rating
AllMusic	4/5 stars
Christgau's Record Guide	C+
Classic Rock	4.5/5 stars
Encyclopedia of Popular Music	4/5 stars
The Great Rock Discography	8/10
MusicHound	4/5
Record Collector	5/5 stars
The Rolling Stone Album Guide	3/5 stars
Sputnikmusic	4/5

Crime of the Century was Supertramp's first U.S. Top 40 album and was eventually certified Gold in the U.S. in 1977, after the release of Even in the Quietest Moments.... The album also marked the commercial breakthrough for the band in the United Kingdom; Crime of the Century peaked at number four in the album chart in March 1975, and "Dreamer" reached number thirteen on the singles chart in the same month. The album was particularly successful in Canada, staying on the album chart for over two years, peaking at number four, and being certified Diamond (10 x platinum) signifying sales of over one million copies.

In 1978, Crime of the Century was ranked 108th in The World Critic Lists, which recognised the 200 greatest albums of all time as voted for by notable rock critics and DJs. Village Voice critic Robert Christgau was ambivalent towards the album's "straight-ahead art-rock", which he called "Queen without preening. Yes without pianistics and meter shifts." Adam Thomas's retrospective review in Sputnikmusic described it as one of the better albums of the 1970s for its powerful expression of young adult confusion and alienation, and for its consistent contrast between prog and pop elements.

In the 1987 edition of The World Critic Lists, CBC's Geoff Edwards ranked Crime of the Century the 10th greatest album of all time. A 1998 public poll, aggregating the votes of more than 200,000 music fans, saw Crime of the Century voted among the all-time top 1000 albums, and it was listed in the 2005 book 1001 Albums You Must Hear Before You Die. In 2015, it was chosen as the 27th greatest progressive rock album by Rolling Stone. Paul Elliott of Classic Rock magazine called it a progressive rock masterpiece.

Many of the songs on the album remained staples of the band's shows well into the 21st century ("School", "Bloody Well Right", "Rudy", and the title song). Ultimate Classic Rock critic Nick DeRiso rated "School" as Supertramp's 3rd greatest song, calling it a "jazz fusion-informed gem" and praising its "free-form creativity," "plaintive lyric" and "stirring musical specificity."

Almost all of the album appears on the band's 1980 live album Paris although the tracks that feature orchestrations on the studio versions ("Asylum", "Rudy", and "Crime of the Century") were replaced by string synthesisers or Oberheim synthesisers, which were played mainly by Helliwell with some help from Hodgson. Hodgson has also included songs from the album ("Dreamer", "Hide in Your Shell", "School" and "If Everyone Was Listening") in his concerts.

On 24 October 2024, The Guardian published a cryptic crossword, written by compiler Tramp, celebrating the 50th anniversary of the release of the album.

== Releases ==
The first release was on vinyl by A&M Records in 1974. In 1977, it became the first pop music LP title re-issued by the audiophile label Mobile Fidelity Sound Lab. A&M released it as one of the first CDs in its "Audio Master Plus" series in 1984, which it then reissued in 1990. Mobile Fidelity also released its own remastered CD version on a gold disc as part of its "Ultradisc" series, in November 1987.

A new remastered CD version of the album was released by A&M in 1997, followed by a different remaster on 11 June 2002. The newer A&M remasters feature all of the album art restored plus credits and full lyrics, which were missing from some earlier editions. Both 1997 and 2002 A&M remasters were from the original tapes by Greg Calbi and Jay Messina at Sterling Sound in New York.

The 1997 remaster has all tracks peaking at 100 per cent, significantly altering the original dynamic range of the recording and effectively adding new distortion to the sound. The 2002 edition is not quite as loud but still has much of the same effect.

The album was re-issued by German audiophile label Speaker's Corner in 1999, as a 180 gram vinyl LP. It has none of the dynamic range compression applied to the A&M remastered CD versions.

It was announced in October 2014 that the album, remastered by Ray Staff, would be reissued in CD, digital download, and 180g vinyl formats on 9 December 2014. In addition to the original album, the release would include a complete recording of a 1975 Hammersmith Odeon concert, a 24-page booklet of photographs, and an essay written by Phil Alexander with new interviews with Ken Scott, Dave Margereson, and most of the band members. Two 10×8 prints and a longer version of the essay were announced as exclusives of the vinyl version.

== Track listing ==
All tracks are written by Rick Davies and Roger Hodgson, except where noted.

Side one
No.	Title	Lead vocals	Length
1.	"School"	Hodgson/Davies	5:35
2.	"Bloody Well Right"	Davies	4:32
3.	"Hide in Your Shell"	Hodgson	6:49
4.	"Asylum"	Davies/Hodgson	6:45

Side two
No.	Title	Lead vocals	Length
5.	"Dreamer"	Hodgson/Davies	3:31
6.	"Rudy"	Davies/Hodgson	7:17
7.	"If Everyone Was Listening"	Hodgson	4:04
8.	"Crime of the Century"	Davies	5:36

=== 2014 Deluxe Edition ===
Disc one
No.	Title	Length

Disc two - Live at Hammersmith March 9th 1975
No.	Title	Writer(s)	Length
1.	"School"		5:54
2.	"Bloody Well Right"		6:46
3.	"Hide in Your Shell"		6:47
4.	"Asylum"		7:01
5.	"Sister Moonshine"		5:30
6.	"Just a Normal Day"		3:59
7.	"Another Man's Woman"		7:42
8.	"Lady"		5:55
9.	"A - You're Adorable"	Buddy Kaye; Sidney Lippman; Fred Wise	2:57
10.	"Dreamer"		3:28
11.	"Rudy"		7:24
12.	"If Everyone Was Listening"		4:33
13.	"Crime of the Century"		6:01

== Personnel ==
Supertramp

- Rick Davies – vocals, keyboards, harmonica
- Roger Hodgson – vocals, guitar, pianos
- John Anthony Helliwell – saxophones, clarinet, backing vocals
- Dougie Thomson – bass guitar
- Bob Siebenberg (credited as Bob C. Benberg) – drums, percussion

Additional musicians

- Christine Helliwell – backing vocals (3)
- Vicky Siebenberg – backing vocals (3)
- Anonymous street musician – musical saw (3)
- Ken Scott – water gong (8)

Production

- Ken Scott – producer, engineer
- Supertramp – producer
- John Jansen – engineer
- Ray Staff – original vinyl mastering
- Richard Hewson – string arrangements
- Paul Wakefield – cover design and photography
- Fabio Nicoli – art direction

== Charts ==
=== Weekly charts ===
Chart (1974–79)	Peak position
Australian Albums (Kent Music Report)	15
Canada Top Albums/CDs (RPM)	4
Dutch Albums (Album Top 100)	25
German Albums (Offizielle Top 100)	5
New Zealand Albums (RMNZ)	12
UK Albums (Official Charts)	4
US Billboard 200	38

Chart (2014–16)	Peak position
Dutch Albums (Album Top 100)	83
French Albums (SNEP)	120
German Albums (Offizielle Top 100)	86
Spanish Albums (Promusicae)	21

Chart (2020)	Peak position
Scottish Albums (Official Charts)	80

Chart (2026)	Peak position
Greek Albums (IFPI)	81

=== Year-end charts ===
Chart (1975)	Peak position
Australian Albums (Kent Music Report)	42
Canada Top Albums/CDs (RPM)	29
New Zealand Albums (RMNZ)	3
UK Albums (OCC)	38

Chart (1976)	Peak position
Australian Albums (Kent Music Report)	63
Canada Top Albums/CDs (RPM)	45
New Zealand Albums (RMNZ)	30

Chart (1977)	Peak position
German Albums (Offizielle Top 100)	49
New Zealand Albums (RMNZ)	16

Chart (1978)	Peak position
German Albums (Offizielle Top 100)	9

Chart (1979)	Peak position
German Albums (Offizielle Top 100)	25
New Zealand Albums (RMNZ)	47

== Certifications ==
Region	Certification	Certified units/sales
Australia (ARIA)	Gold	20,000^{^}
Canada (Music Canada)	Diamond	1,000,000^{^}
France (SNEP)	Platinum	400,000^{*}
Germany (BVMI)	Gold	250,000^{^}
Netherlands (NVPI)	Gold	50,000^{^}
New Zealand (RMNZ)	Platinum	15,000^{^}
Portugal (AFP)	Gold	20,000^{^}
Sweden (GLF)	Gold	50,000^{^}
Switzerland (IFPI Switzerland)	Gold	25,000^{^}
United Kingdom (BPI)	Gold	100,000^{^}
United States (RIAA)	Gold	500,000^{^}
^{*} Sales figures based on certification alone.^{^} Shipments figures based on certification alone.
