= Give a Little Bit =

1977 single by Supertramp

Single by Supertramp

from the album Even in the Quietest Moments...
- B-side: "Downstream"
- Released: 27 May 1977
- Recorded: 15 November 1976
- Studio: Caribou Ranch (Nederland, Colorado)
- Genre: Progressive pop; folk rock; soft rock
- Length: 4:08
- Label: A&M
- Songwriters: Rick Davies; Roger Hodgson
- Producer: Supertramp

Supertramp singles chronology
"Sister Moonshine" (1976)	"Give a Little Bit" (1977)	"Babaji" (1977)

Official audio
- "Give a Little Bit" on YouTube

"Give a Little Bit" is the opening song on Supertramp's 1977 album Even in the Quietest Moments.... It was written by Roger Hodgson and credited to the Rick Davies–Roger Hodgson partnership. The song was released as a single that same year and became an international hit for the band, peaking at number 15 on the Billboard Pop Singles chart. It was a chart hit in the band's native UK, reaching number 29 on the UK singles chart.

== Recording and composition ==
"Give a Little Bit" was first written by Roger Hodgson when he was 19 or 20 years old before it was introduced to the band for recording five to six years later. Hodgson stated that the song was inspired by the Beatles' "All You Need Is Love", released during the love and peace movement of the 1960s.

Hodgson said of the song in 2023:

Even at an unwizened young age when I wrote this song, I saw that the world needed love. I believed in love – it was always for love – and I just felt that was the most important thing in life. This song has really taken on a life of its own, and I think it’s even more relevant today than when I wrote it. Because we really are needing to value love in a much deeper way, and also we’re needing to care.

Drummer Bob Siebenberg recounted that "Roger had been working at Malibu for quite a while on this tune. I'd hear the song in hotel rooms and places like that. He had the song on a little tape when I first joined the band so I was quite familiar with the tune. We tried out various drum things and it seemed right to ride it along on the snare drum […] giving it something almost like a train beat. So it's all on the snare and bass drum, with no tom-tom fills or anything."

Its writing credits are given to Rick Davies and Roger Hodgson, although it is a Hodgson composition. Regarding Supertramp songs, Hodgson and Davies shared writing credits from 1974 until 1983, when Hodgson left Supertramp.

== Reception ==
Cash Box said that it "would be a great crack at a pop hit for any artist," that "the rhythm is gentle, yet persuasive; the harmonies are full of uplifting momentum" and "the lead vocal has a vulnerable quality similar to Peter Gabriel's work." Record World praised "its easy, flowing style."

Ultimate Classic Rock critic Nick DeRiso rated it as Supertramp's all-time best song, calling it a "singalong paean to the Golden Rule." Gary Graff of Billboard rated "Give a Little Bit" as Supertramp's 9th best song, praising its "chiming 12-string acoustic guitar and Hodgson’s keening vocals."

Hodgson rated it as one of the top 10 songs he ever wrote.

== Live performances ==
"Give a Little Bit" was recorded to be released on the live album Paris, but the song was dropped because the band members found all the available recordings of the song to be of unacceptable quality.

After Hodgson had left Supertramp, the song was included in almost all his live performances. The song has also been performed by Hodgson during his tour with Ringo Starr & His All-Starr Band in 2001; a recording appears on the album Ringo Starr and Friends. On Sunday 1 July 2007, Roger Hodgson sang this song as his finale for his short set at the Concert for Diana, held at Wembley Stadium in London. Princess Diana loved the song, and Hodgson said of the performance in her honour: "It was very wonderful when the audience all stood up, and the princes also, to sing 'Give a Little Bit' with me. That was a magical moment." "Give a Little Bit" can also be found on Hodgson's album Classics Live, a collection of his live performances from acoustic, band and orchestra shows recorded on tour in 2010.

After Hodgson's departure from Supertramp, the band included the song for the first time in their set list in 2002 during their One More for the Road Tour. The song was sung by Jesse Siebenberg. The band also played the song in their 70–10 Tour in 2010.

== In popular culture ==
"Give a Little Bit" has been used in films such as Superman and The Invention of Lying and in some commercials, such as for the Gap and to encourage giving to charity drives.

== Track listings ==
=== 7" vinyl single (1977) ===
Side one
No.	Title	Length
1.	"Give a Little Bit"	3:20

Side two
No.	Title	Length
1.	"Downstream"	4:00

=== CD single (1990) ===
No.	Title	Length
1.	"Give a Little Bit"	4:07
2.	"The Logical Song" (Live version)	3:41
3.	"Bloody Well Right" (Live version)	6:11

=== CD single (1992) ===
No.	Title	Length
1.	"Give a Little Bit"	4:10
2.	"Give a Little Bit" (Live version)	4:03
3.	"Breakfast in America"	2:38

=== CD single (2012) ===
Give a Little Bit (with choir)

== Charts ==
=== Weekly charts ===
Chart (1977)	Peak position
Belgium (Ultratop 50 Flanders)	12
Belgium (Ultratop 50 Wallonia)	26
Canada Top Singles (RPM)	8
Netherlands (Dutch Top 40)	2
Netherlands (Single Top 100)	2
New Zealand (Recorded Music NZ)	14
Norway (VG-lista)	9
South Africa (Springbok)	4
UK Singles (Official Charts)	29
US Billboard Hot 100	15
U.S. Cash Box Top 100	12
West Germany (GfK)	29

=== Year-end charts ===
Chart (1977)	Position
Belgium (Ultratop Flanders)	71
Canada Top Singles (RPM)	84
Netherlands (Dutch Top 40)	3
Netherlands (Single Top 100)	5
US Billboard Hot 100	78

== Certifications ==
Region	Certification	Certified units/sales
Denmark (IFPI Danmark)	Gold	45,000^{‡}
Spain (Promusicae)	Platinum	60,000^{‡}
United Kingdom (BPI)	Platinum	600,000^{‡}
^{‡} Sales+streaming figures based on certification alone.

== Personnel ==
Credits listed by Matt Hurwitz of Mix.

- Roger Hodgson – 12-string acoustic guitars, 12-string Rickenbacker electric guitar, 6-string electric guitar, lead and backing vocals
- Dougie Thomson – Fender Jazz Bass
- Bob Siebenberg – drums and percussion
- Rick Davies – clavinet, piano, organ
- John Helliwell – saxophone

== Goo Goo Dolls version ==
"Give a Little Bit"

Single by Goo Goo Dolls

from the album Let Love In and Live in Buffalo: July 4th, 2004
- B-side: "Sympathy"
- Released: 11 October 2004
- Length: 3:35
- Label: Warner Bros.
- Songwriters: Rick Davies; Roger Hodgson
- Producers: Goo Goo Dolls; Rob Cavallo

Goo Goo Dolls singles chronology
"Sympathy" (2002)	"Give a Little Bit" (2004)	"Better Days" (2005)

In 2004, American rock band Goo Goo Dolls covered the song, releasing it as a single in October of that year. It peaked at number 37 on the Billboard Hot 100 chart in February 2005. It was first covered (partially) in 2001, when guitarist and lead vocalist Johnny Rzeznik appeared in an ad for The Gap singing the song along with other artists. The song opened the live album Live in Buffalo: July 4th, 2004, and later appeared as a track on their hit album Let Love In. In May 2006, their version of "Give a Little Bit" was honored by the American Society of Composers, Authors and Publishers (ASCAP) in recognition of being one of the most played songs in the ASCAP repertoire in 2005.

=== Track listing ===
No.	Title	Length
1.	"Give a Little Bit"	3:35
2.	"Sympathy"	2:58
3.	"Give a Little Bit" (acoustic version)	3:35

=== Charts ===
==== Weekly charts ====
Chart (2005)	Peak position
Austria (Ö3 Austria Top 40)	45
Canada Hot AC Top 30 (Radio & Records)	1
Germany (GfK)	78
US Billboard Hot 100	37
US Adult Contemporary (Billboard)	5
US Adult Pop Airplay (Billboard)	1

==== Year-end charts ====
Chart (2004)	Position
US Adult Top 40 (Billboard)	60

Chart (2005)	Position
US Adult Contemporary (Billboard)	8
US Adult Top 40 (Billboard)	4

=== Release history ===
Region	Date	Format(s)	Label(s)	Ref.
United States	11 October 2004	Hot adult contemporary radio	Warner Bros.	
United States	29 November 2004	Contemporary hit radio	Warner Bros.	

== Other versions ==
In January 2005, cover versions produced and arranged by John Fields were recorded by John Ondrasik and UNICEF ambassadors Clay Aiken and India Arie. The covers were created as part of the "Kids Help Out" public service announcement campaign designed by Cartoon Network to inspire viewers to support relief efforts toward the victims of the 2004 Indian Ocean earthquake and tsunami. For the campaign, Hodgson also provided a new recording with an 80-piece orchestra and choir.
