= ...Famous Last Words... =

Studio album by Supertramp
- Released: 29 October 1982
- Recorded: November 1981 – mid-1982
- Studios: Unicorn (Nevada City, California); The Backyard (Encino, Los Angeles); Rumbo Recorders (Canoga Park, Los Angeles); Bill Schnee Studios (North Hollywood, Los Angeles)
- Genres: Progressive rock; pop
- Length: 47:35
- Label: A&M
- Producers: Peter Henderson, Russel Pope, Supertramp

Supertramp chronology
Paris (1980)	...Famous Last Words... (1982)	Brother Where You Bound (1985)

Singles from ...Famous Last Words...
- 1. "It's Raining Again" Released: October 1982; 2. "My Kind of Lady" Released: January 1983; 3. "Crazy" Released: March 1983; 4. "Don't Leave Me Now" Released: May 1983

...Famous Last Words... (stylised in all lowercase), released in October 1982, is the seventh studio album by the British rock band Supertramp. It was the studio follow-up to 1979's Breakfast in America and the last album with vocalist/keyboardist/guitarist Roger Hodgson, who left the group to pursue a solo career. Thus, it was the final album to be released by the classic lineup of the band (Hodgson, Davies, Helliwell, Thomson, and Siebenberg).

The album reached number 5 on the Billboard Pop Albums Charts in its third week on the chart dated November 27, 1982, and was certified Gold for sales in excess of 500,000 copies there. It also peaked at number 6 in the UK where it was certified Gold for 100,000 copies sold.

A remastered CD version of ...Famous Last Words... was released on 30 July 2002 on A&M Records. The remastered CD comes with all the original artwork and the CD art features a green pair of scissors and a black background.

== Background and recording ==
Though Rick Davies and Roger Hodgson had long been writing their songs separately, they had always conceived the theme and overlying direction for each album together. ...Famous Last Words... became the exception to this rule: having been living in different parts of California in the months leading up to the recording, they each conceived their own vision for the album. Hodgson wanted to do another pop album in the vein of Breakfast in America, while Davies had envisioned a heavy progressive rock album with a 10-minute song called "Brother Where You Bound" as its centerpiece.

According to Bob Siebenberg, "In the end, they both kind of changed their formats and their picture of what they thought this album should be. It became a diluted version of what it started out to be. It was really neither here nor there." In particular, the band decided to leave out "Brother Where You Bound", since it was too "heavy" to fit alongside Hodgson's pop compositions. Supertramp used "Brother Where You Bound" for their next album, Brother Where You Bound (1985), though it had by that point evolved from 10 minutes to 16 and a half through the addition of some new sections.

As usual, the songs are all officially credited as being written by Davies/Hodgson. However, the sleeve notes colour-code the songs' lyrics by individual author. The lead vocalist on each song is the same as its writer: "Crazy", "It's Raining Again", "Know Who You Are", "C'est le bon", and "Don't Leave Me Now" were written by Hodgson, and "Put on Your Old Brown Shoes", "Bonnie", "My Kind of Lady", and "Waiting So Long" were written by Davies.

The album's working title was Tightrope. The album was mainly recorded and mixed at Hodgson's home, Unicorn Studios in Nevada City, California, as he did not want to leave his wife, his then two-year-old daughter Heidi, and newborn son Andrew behind. Davies wound up recording his vocal and keyboard parts at his home studio, The Backyard Studios, in Encino, California. Other overdubs were at Bill Schnee Recording Studios in Los Angeles.

At the time of the album's release, many interpreted the title (which at that point became ...Famous Last Words...) and cover art as thinly veiled hints that Supertramp was breaking up. In a 2015 interview, Hodgson confirmed that he and Davies decided on the title because "we weren't doing [a record] again". He said that he regrets recording the album, calling it "a last-ditch attempt to try and make things happen" after the life had gone out of the band. Conversely, John Helliwell said in 1986: "We wanted a phrase that bore some relationship with what we were doing but was enigmatic at the same time. We always like to have enigmatic titles like Crime of the Century ... This last LP we thought was going to be real quick. We thought we were going to rehearse it and record it real quick and it ended up taking longer than any other so we had to eat our words again. For the past three or four LPs we've been saying, 'Let's be well prepared.' So the title sprung out of that as well. I can't remember who first thought of it. The graphic design came directly from the title."

== Reception ==
Professional ratings
Review scores
Source	Rating
AllMusic	3/5 stars
The Encyclopedia of Popular Music	3/5 stars
The Rolling Stone Album Guide	2/5 stars
Smash Hits	8/10

A contemporary review in Creem savaged the album for its nondescript nature, concluding "this stuff is so soddenly bland already that the Muzak folks are going to have their work cut out for them". AllMusic, in a retrospective review, found the album overly tailored towards commercial success, claiming that the group in general and Roger Hodgson in particular were too fixated on producing more hits, and that as a result "romantically inclined poetry and love song fluff replaces the lyrical keenness that Supertramp had produced in the past, and the instrumental proficiency that they once mastered has vanished."

== Track listing ==
All tracks are written by Rick Davies and Roger Hodgson. Listed below are the respective writers, also lead singers of their songs.

Side one
No.	Title	Writer(s)	Length
1.	"Crazy"	Roger Hodgson	4:44
2.	"Put On Your Old Brown Shoes"	Rick Davies	4:22
3.	"It's Raining Again"	Hodgson	4:24
4.	"Bonnie"	Davies	5:37
5.	"Know Who You Are"	Hodgson	5:00

Side two
No.	Title	Writer(s)	Length
6.	"My Kind of Lady"	Davies	5:15
7.	"C'est le bon"	Hodgson	5:32
8.	"Waiting So Long"	Davies	6:35
9.	"Don't Leave Me Now"	Hodgson	6:24

== Personnel ==
Supertramp

- Rick Davies – lead and backing vocals, organ (tracks 1, 7, 9), piano (tracks 2, 4, 6, 8), electric piano (track 2), synthesizers (track 3), harmonica (tracks 2, 9), melodica (track 3)
- Roger Hodgson – lead and backing vocals, electric guitar (tracks 1, 2, 4, 6, 8, 9), 12-string guitar (tracks 2, 5, 7), piano (tracks 1, 3, 9), pump organ (track 1), synthesizers (track 5), glockenspiel (track 3)
- John Helliwell – saxophones (tracks 1–3, 6, 8, 9), clarinet (tracks 7, 8), synthesizers (tracks 3, 4, 6, 8, 9)
- Dougie Thomson – bass (tracks 1–4, 6–9)
- Bob Siebenberg – drums (tracks 1–4, 6–9)
  - This was the first Supertramp album for which Siebenberg was credited under his real name. All previous Supertramp albums on which he had appeared credited him as "Bob C. Benberg".

Additional personnel

- Claire Diament – backing vocals on "Don't Leave Me Now"
- Ann Wilson – backing vocals on "Put On Your Old Brown Shoes" and "C'est le bon"
- Nancy Wilson – backing vocals on "Put On Your Old Brown Shoes" and "C'est le bon"

=== Production ===
- Producers: Peter Henderson, Russel Pope, Supertramp
- Engineer: Peter Henderson
- Assistant engineer: Norman Hall
- Mastering on original issue: Doug Sax, Mike Reese
- Mastering on 2002 remaster: Greg Calbi, Jay Messina
- Concert sound: Russel Pope
- Technicians: Bud Wyatt, Ian "Biggles" Lloyd-Bisley
- String arrangements: Richard Hewson
- Synthesizers: Yamaha GS-1, Oberheim
- Art direction: Mike Doud, Norman Moore
- Design: Mike Doud, Norman Moore
- Cover design: Mike Dowd, Norman Moore
- Cover art concept: Mike Dowd
- Artwork: Mike Dowd
- Photography: Jules Bates, Tom Gibson
- Cover photo: Jules Bates, Tom Gibson
- Sleeve photo: Tom Gibson

2002 A&M reissue:

The 2002 A&M Records reissue was mastered from the original master tapes by Greg Calbi and Jay Messina at Sterling Sound, New York, 2002. The reissue was supervised by Bill Levenson with art direction by Vartan and design by Mike Diehl, with production coordination by Beth Stempel.

The intro to "Bonnie" contains a glitch in the piano part on the 2002 remaster, and has never been fully explained (whether it was a mastering error, or an intentional alteration to the track).

== Charts ==
=== Weekly charts ===
Chart (1982–83)	Position
Australian Albums (Kent Music Report)	2
Austrian Albums (Ö3 Austria)	4
Canada Top Albums/CDs (RPM)	1
Dutch Albums (Album Top 100)	1
French Albums (SNEP)	1
German Albums (Offizielle Top 100)	1
Italian Albums (Musica e dischi)	5
Japanese Albums (Oricon)	40
New Zealand Albums (RMNZ)	5
Norwegian Albums (VG-lista)	2
Swedish Albums (Sverigetopplistan)	5
UK Albums (Official Charts)	6
US Billboard 200	5

Chart (2025)	Peak position
Greek Albums (IFPI)	65

=== Year-end charts ===
Chart (1982)	Position
Australian Albums (Kent Music Report)	56
Canada Top Albums/CDs (RPM)	28
French Albums (SNEP)	29

Chart (1983)	Position
Australian Albums (Kent Music Report)	54
Austrian Albums (Ö3 Austria)[	19
Canada Top Albums/CDs (RPM)	23
German Albums (Offizielle Top 100)	6
US Billboard 200	54

== Certifications and sales ==
Region	Certification	Certified units/sales
Australia (ARIA)	Platinum	50,000^{^}
Brazil	—	200,000
Canada (Music Canada)	Platinum	100,000^{^}
France (SNEP)	Platinum	400,000^{*}
Germany (BVMI)	Platinum	500,000^{^}
Netherlands (NVPI)	Gold	50,000^{^}
New Zealand (RMNZ)	Platinum	15,000^{^}
United Kingdom (BPI)	Gold	100,000^{^}
United States (RIAA)	Gold	500,000^{^}
Yugoslavia	—	26,565
Summaries
Europe 1982-1985 sales	—	2,000,000
^{*} Sales figures based on certification alone.^{^} Shipments figures based on certification alone.
