= Classics Live =

Classics Live may refer to:

- Classics Live (Roger Hodgson album), 2010
- Classics Live I and II, a 1986 album by Aerosmith
