= Even in the Quietest Moments... =

Studio album by Supertramp
- Released: 8 April 1977
- Recorded: November 1976 – January 1977
- Studios: Caribou Ranch, Nederland; Record Plant, Los Angeles
- Genres: Progressive rock; art rock
- Length: 43:27
- Label: A&M
- Producer: Supertramp

Supertramp chronology
Crisis? What Crisis? (1975)	Even in the Quietest Moments... (1977)	Breakfast in America (1979)

Singles from Even in the Quietest Moments...
- 1. "Give a Little Bit" Released: 27 May 1977; 2. "Babaji" Released: 4 November 1977

Even in the Quietest Moments... is the fifth studio album by the British rock band Supertramp, released on 8 April 1977, by A&M Records. It was recorded mainly at Caribou Ranch in Colorado with overdubs, vocals, and mixing completed at the Record Plant in Los Angeles. This was Supertramp's first album to use engineer Peter Henderson, who would work with the band for their next three albums as well.

Even in the Quietest Moments… reached number 16 on the Billboard Pop Albums Chart in 1977 and within a few months of release became Supertramp's first Gold (500,000 copies or more)–selling album in the US. In addition, "Give a Little Bit" became a US Top 20 single and reached number 29 on the UK Singles Chart. While "Give a Little Bit" was the big hit, both "Fool's Overture" and the title track also received a fair amount of FM album-rock play.

In 1978, Even in the Quietest Moments… was ranked 63rd in The World Critic Lists, which was a list of 200 albums compiled by Paul Gambaccini from votes by 47 rock critics and DJs.

== Background and recording ==
I think it was Roger who wanted to get out of Los Angeles to do a record. At the time, the sky was the limit, so we decided to record at the Caribou Ranch, on a mountaintop outside of Denver. What we didn't realize was that the thin air in the mountains makes your voice go weird. It also made it hard for John [Helliwell] to play the sax. So we ended up finishing it back in L.A. at the Record Plant. – Rick Davies, Retrospectacle – The Supertramp Anthology CD booklet (2005)

Though all the songs are credited as being written jointly by Rick Davies and Roger Hodgson, Davies wrote "Lover Boy", "Downstream", and "From Now On" by himself, and Hodgson in turn wrote "Give a Little Bit", "Even in the Quietest Moments", "Babaji", and "Fool's Overture" unaided.

Davies said of "Lover Boy" that "I was inspired by advertisements in men's magazines telling you how to pick up women. You know, you send away for it and it's guaranteed not to fail. If you haven't slept with at least five women in two weeks, you can get your money back." Bob Siebenberg recounted that "Rick had been working on 'Lover Boy' for quite a while and finally came up with the long middle section. I just heard that as a really slow, really solid sort of beat, just to give the song dynamics underneath it all, because the song itself is really powerful and it needed something really solid underneath it."

Most of "Even in the Quietest Moments" was written during the soundcheck for a show at the Tivoli Gardens in Copenhagen. Davies and Hodgson worked out the various parts of the song with Hodgson using an Oberheim and a Solina string synthesiser and Davies at the drum kit. Davies commented on the music: "It starts off in a very standard melody thing and then it notches onto a sort of one chord progression or perhaps we should call it a digression. It's a thing where there's hundreds of sounds coming in and going out, a whole collage thing." Hodgson said of the lyrics: "It's kind of a dual love song – it could be to a girl or it could be to God." Gary Graff of Billboard rated "Even in the Quietest Moments" as Supertramp's fourth-best song.

"Downstream" is performed solely by Davies on vocal and piano, which were recorded together in one take. Siebenberg has described the song as his favourite on the album "because it's so personal and so pure".

Graff rated "From Now On" as Supertramp's eighth-best song, highlighting John Helliwell's saxophone solo and the call-and-response singalong at the end.

"Fool's Overture" had the working title of "The String Machine Epic", and according to John Helliwell: "It came primarily from a few melodies Roger worked out on the string machine thing we use on stage." Written and sung by guitarist/keyboardist Roger Hodgson – who took five years to compose it – the song is a collage of progressive instrumentation and sound samples. Hodgson stated that the song's lyrics are essentially meaningless, explaining: "I like being vague and yet saying enough to set people's imaginations running riot." He also said:

It was very magical the way it came together. It was actually three separate pieces of music that I had for a few years and then one day they all just came together in what I think is a magnificent, kind of epic piece of music.

First are excerpts of Winston Churchill's famous 4 June 1940 House of Commons speech regarding Britain's involvement in the Second World War ("Never Surrender"), followed by sounds of crowds, police sirens and bells from London's famous Westminster chime Big Ben clock tower. The flageolet-sounding instrument plays an excerpt from Gustav Holst's "Venus", from his orchestral suite The Planets. There is also a reading of the first verse of William Blake's poem "And did those feet in ancient time" (more commonly known as "Jerusalem"), ended by a short sample of the band's song "Dreamer". Ultimate Classic Rock critic Nick DeRiso rated it as Supertramp's seventh-best song. Hodgson rated it as one of the 10 best songs he has written.

== Album cover ==
The front cover is a photo of a snow-covered piano and bench with a scenic mountain peak backdrop. The piano was an actual, though gutted, grand piano brought to the Eldora Mountain Resort, a ski area near Caribou Ranch Studios, which was left overnight and photographed after a fresh snowfall. The sheet music on the piano, though inscribed "Fool's Overture", is in actuality "The Star-Spangled Banner".

== Remaster ==
A remastered CD version of the album with full original artwork, lyrics, and credits restored (including the inner sleeve picture of the band absent from the original CD) was released on 11 June 2002 on A&M Records in the US.

== Critical reception ==
Professional ratings
Review scores
Source	Rating
AllMusic	3.5/5 stars
Christgau's Record Guide	C+
The Encyclopedia of Popular Music	3/5 stars
MusicHound Rock	3/5 stars
The Rolling Stone Album Guide	3/5 stars

In Christgau's Record Guide: Rock Albums of the Seventies (1981), Robert Christgau remarked that, unlike most progressive rock, which is "pretentious background schlock that's all too hard to ignore", the album is "modest background schlock that sounds good when it slips into the ear."

AllMusic gave a mixed retrospective review of the album, calling it "elegant yet mildly absurd, witty but kind of obscure", but adding that it "places a greater emphasis on melody and gentle textures than any previous Supertramp release". It criticised the album as not being "full formed", but marked "Give a Little Bit", "Lover Boy", "Fool's Overture", and "From Now On" as worthy of praise.

== Track listing ==
All tracks are written by Rick Davies and Roger Hodgson.

Side one
No.	Title	Length
1.	"Give a Little Bit"	4:08
2.	"Lover Boy"	6:49
3.	"Even in the Quietest Moments"	6:26
4.	"Downstream"	4:00
Total length:		21:23

Side two
No.	Title	Length
5.	"Babaji"	4:51
6.	"From Now On"	6:21
7.	"Fool's Overture"	10:52
Total length:		22:04

== 1997 and 2002 A&M reissue ==
The 1997 and 2002 A&M Records reissues were mastered from the original master tapes by Greg Calbi and Jay Messina at Sterling Sound, New York, in 1997 and 2002. The reissues were supervised by Bill Levenson with art direction by Vartan and design by Mike Diehl, with production coordination by Beth Stempel.

== Personnel ==
=== Supertramp ===
- Roger Hodgson – vocals, 12-string guitar (tracks 1, 3), electric guitar (tracks 1, 2, 5, 6), piano (tracks 5, 7), synthesizers (track 7), pump organ (track 7)
- Rick Davies – vocals, piano (tracks 1, 2, 4, 6, 7), organ (tracks 1, 3, 6), synthesizers (tracks 2, 3, 5, 7), clavinet (track 1), electric piano (track 6), melodica (track 6)
- Dougie Thomson – bass (tracks 1–3, 5–7)
- John Helliwell – saxophones (tracks 1, 2, 5–7), clarinets (track 3, 7), backing vocals
- Bob Siebenberg (credited as Bob C. Benberg) – drums and percussion (tracks 1–3, 5–7)

=== Production ===
- Supertramp – producers, orchestral arrangements
- Peter Henderson – engineer
- Tom Anderson – assistant engineer, remixing
- Tom Likes – assistant engineer
- Steve Smith – assistant engineer
- Geoff Emerick – mixing engineer
- Russel Pope – concert sound engineer
- Garey Mielke – Oberheim programming
- Michel Colombier, Supertramp – orchestral arrangements
- Mike Doud – art direction and design
- Bob Seidemann – photography
- Kenneth McGowan – inner sleeve photography
- Frank DeLuna – mastering on original LP
- Greg Calbi – remastering
- Jay Messina – remastering

== Charts ==
=== Weekly charts ===
Chart (1977–78)	Peak position
Australian Albums (Kent Music Report)	5
Canada Top Albums/CDs (RPM)	1
Dutch Albums (Album Top 100)	1
German Albums (Offizielle Top 100)	14
New Zealand Albums (RMNZ)	2
Norwegian Albums (VG-lista)	3
Swedish Albums (Sverigetopplistan)	5
UK Albums (Official Charts)	12
US Billboard 200	16
US CashBox Top 100	19

Chart (2007)	Peak position
Spanish Albums (Promusicae)	5

Chart (2026)	Peak position
German Rock & Metal Albums (Offizielle Top 100)	20

=== Year-end charts ===
Chart (1977)	Peak position
Australian Albums (Kent Music Report)	7
Canada Top Albums/CDs (RPM)	7
Dutch Albums (Album Top 100)	4
New Zealand Albums (RMNZ)	7
US Billboard 200	41

Chart (1978)	Peak position
German Albums (Offizielle Top 100)	42

== Certifications and sales ==
Region	Certification	Certified units/sales
Canada (Music Canada)	Platinum	100,000^{^}
France (SNEP)	Platinum	400,000^{*}
Germany (BVMI)	Gold	250,000^{^}
Netherlands (NVPI)	2× Gold	100,000^{^}
Norway	—	20,000
Switzerland (IFPI Switzerland)	Platinum	50,000^{^}
United Kingdom (BPI)	Silver	60,000^{^}
United States (RIAA)	Gold	500,000^{^}
^{*} Sales figures based on certification alone.^{^} Shipments figures based on certification alone.
