= Freddy Hausser =

Freddy Hausser (24 May 1936 – 22 September 2008) was a French combat journalist, television producer and photographer.

== Biography ==
After serving with the French military in Algeria, Hausser began his journalism career by reporting on other conflicts, including the Vietnam War and the Six-Day War. He went back to Algeria, to cover events for the independence in 1962 and got married with Claudette Escoffier with whom he had two children. Frederic Hausser (1963–1981) and Dorothée Hausser (1966) both born in Paris, France.

In 1976, he stopped reporting from war zones in order to create, produce and present, in Juke Box, a music television program on the national French television channel, Antenne 2. In this capacity, he introduced millions of French people to many new pop and rock groups, especially from England and America. Eventually, he became good friends with many of these performers, such as Jefferson Airplane, Led Zeppelin, B.B. King, Jackson Browne, and later, AC/DC.

Leveraging his contacts and reputation in the rock world, he was able to make a documentary film, The Rolling Stones Live at the Slaughterhouse, of The Rolling Stones performing at the Pavillon de Paris.

Hausser died in 2008, at the age of 71, after a long illness.

== Filmography ==
- 1975-1978 : Juke Box
- 1976 : The Rolling Stones Live at the Slaughterhouse
- 1981 : The Clash in Paris
- 1982 : "Exclusive Interview With Mick Jagger"
- 1994 : Children of the Earth
- 2003 : The Rolling Stones Live in Paris
