= Take the Long Way Home (Supertramp song) =

1979 single by Supertramp

- 1980 United Kingdom live single picture sleeve

Single by Supertramp

from the album Breakfast in America
- B-side: "Rudy"
- Released: October 1979 (US): 26 September 1980 (live)
- Recorded: 1978
- Studio: The Village Recorder/Studio B, Los Angeles, California
- Genre: Progressive rock
- Length: 5:08; 4:06 (DJ single version)
- Label: A&M
- Songwriter: Roger Hodgson
- Producers: Supertramp, Peter Henderson

Supertramp singles chronology
"Goodbye Stranger" (1979)	"Take the Long Way Home" (1979)	"Dreamer (live)" (1980)

Official audio
- "Take the Long Way Home" on YouTube

"Take the Long Way Home" is the third US single and sixth track of the British rock band Supertramp's 1979 album Breakfast in America. It was the last song written for the album, being penned during the nine-month recording cycle. In 1980, the live version from Paris became a minor hit in various European countries.

== Background ==
According to its composer Roger Hodgson, the song deals with how the desire to go home can go both ways:

I'm talking about not wanting to go home to the wife, take the long way home to the wife because she treats you like part of the furniture, but there's a deeper level to the song, too. I really believe we all want to find our home, find that place in us where we feel at home, and to me, home is in the heart and that is really, when we are in touch with our heart and we're living our life from our heart, then we do feel like we found our home.

Hodgson also said:

Take the long way home is a metaphor for the universal journey of self-discovery. The song is a vehicle for reflection in which the sometimes-disappointing realities in our grown up lives can reflect in a not so positive way on the hopeful idealism of our youth... A lot of my songs have multi-levels and the deeper meaning to this song is about taking the long way home to our true home, that place of real connection inside our heart.

This was the last song composed for Breakfast in America.

== Reception ==
Billboard magazine contributor David Farrell praised the "convincing melody with a crafty hook", although he felt the music contrasted with the "pessimistic lyric about man's loss of identity in an increasingly complex world." Cash Box called it "a bouncy, uptempo number, laden with pop-symphonic instrumentals, high-pitched vocals and harmonies and a jaunty harmonic figure". Record World said that "brisk keyboards slice through the bouncy rhythm and trademark vocals."

Ultimate Classic Rock critic Nick DeRiso rated it as Supertramp's 8th best song. Gary Graff of Billboard rated "Take the Long Way Home" as Supertramp's 7th best song, noting its "bouncy melody awash with keyboards" and the "rich sax-and-harmonica exchange between [John] Helliwell and [Rick] Davies."

Hodgson rated it as one of the top 10 songs he ever wrote.

The single reached number 10 on the U.S. charts and number 4 in the Canadian charts.

== Charts ==
=== Weekly charts ===
Chart (1979–1980)	Peak position
Canada Top Singles (RPM)	4
Netherlands (Single Top 100)	32
Germany (GfK)	53
US Billboard Hot 100	10

=== Year-end charts ===
Chart (1979)	Position
Canada Top Singles (RPM)	83
Chart (1980)	Position
Canada Top Singles (RPM)	76
US Top Pop Singles (Billboard)	86

== Other versions ==
- The band Trixter recorded the song for their 1994 release Undercovers.
- Alternative rock band Lazlo Bane included it on their 2007 cover album Guilty Pleasures.
