= Breakfast in America (song) =

Single by Supertramp

from the album Breakfast in America
- B-side: "Gone Hollywood"
- Released: June 1979
- Recorded: 1978
- Studio: The Village Recorder/Studio B, Los Angeles, California
- Genre: Progressive pop
- Length: 2:39
- Label: A&M
- Songwriters: Rick Davies, Roger Hodgson
- Producers: Supertramp, Peter Henderson

Supertramp singles chronology
"The Logical Song" (1979)	"Breakfast in America" (1979)	"Goodbye Stranger" (1979)

Music video
- "Breakfast in America" on YouTube

"Breakfast in America"
A 26-second clip of "Breakfast in America" as performed by Roger Hodgson.

"Breakfast in America" is the title track from British rock band Supertramp's 1979 album of the same name. Credited to Rick Davies and Roger Hodgson, it was a top-ten hit in the UK and a live version of the song reached no. 62 on the Billboard Hot 100 in January 1981. The lyrics tell about a person, presumably British, who dreams of visiting the United States.

== Composition ==
The inner sleeve of the 1979 Breakfast in America album lists one musician – Roger Hodgson or Rick Davies – as composer for each song. For the "Breakfast in America" title track, Davies alone is incorrectly listed as composer and lyricist. However, the centre label of the 12-inch vinyl disc credits all songs to both Hodgson and Davies. Similarly, on the vinyl single, it was credited to Hodgson and Davies.

Supertramp started performing the song during a reunion tour without Hodgson; the latter took credit for writing the song, telling reporters that Davies initially "hated" the song, and that he believed Davies did not play on the recording at all. According to Hodgson, he wrote the song when he was 19 years old. Hodgson said: "I was dreaming and having fun one day and this song just flowed out. I think the lyric was written in about an hour, it just came out of me." Hodgson has credited Davies with creating the vocalised retort line: "What's she got? Not a lot."

According to Ultimate Classic Rock critic Nick DeRiso, Hodgson started writing the song as a teenager, and Davies later "helped sharpen the lyrics". Billboard critic Gary Graff agrees with this assessment, including Davies contributing the "What's she got? Not a lot" lyric. Roger Hodgson uploaded an .mp3 version of his original 2-track demo of the track from ca. 1969 to his website in the early 2000s.

DeRiso describes the lyrics as being about a child dreaming about visiting the United States some day.

Hodgson included the song in his 2010 world tour, produced as a live album titled Classics Live.

== Reception ==
Billboard writer David Farrell praised John Helliwell's "Benny Goodman-flavoured clarinet solo". DeRiso rated it as Supertramp's 9th greatest song. Graff rated "Breakfast in America" as Supertramp's fifth best song.

Record World predicted that "AOR-pop radio will make sure that [the live version would become] a morning staple", noting Hodgson's "light and lively" vocal performance.

The Gym Class Heroes song "Cupid's Chokehold" samples the music and chorus of "Breakfast in America".

Hodgson rated it as one of the top ten songs he ever wrote.

== Charts ==
Chart (1979–80)	Peak position
Austria (Ö3 Austria Top 40)	16
Belgium (Ultratop 50 Flanders)	18
Germany (GfK)	23
Ireland (IRMA)	6
Japan (Oricon Singles Chart)	20
Netherlands (Single Top 100)	14
Netherlands (Dutch Top 40)	16
South Africa (Springbok)	9
UK Singles (Official Charts)	9
US Billboard Hot 100	62

== Certifications ==
Region	Certification	Certified units/sales
Denmark (IFPI Danmark)	Gold	45,000^{‡}
Italy (FIMI)	Gold	50,000^{‡}
Spain (Promusicae)	Gold	30,000^{‡}
United Kingdom (BPI)	Platinum	600,000^{‡}
^{‡} Sales+streaming figures based on certification alone.

== Sources ==
- Melhuish, Martin (1986). The Supertramp Book (1st ed.). Omnibus Press. ISBN 978-0711907874.
