= Classics Live (Roger Hodgson album) =

Live album by Roger Hodgson
- Released: 2010
- Recorded: 2010
- Genre: Progressive rock, pop rock, art rock
- Label: Roger Hodgson Music
- Producer: Roger Hodgson

Roger Hodgson chronology
Open the Door (2000)	Classics Live (2010)

Classics Live is the fifth solo album by former Supertramp songwriter and co-founder Roger Hodgson, and his second live album.

== Overview ==
Classics Live is a collection of his live performances from acoustic, band and orchestra shows recorded on his 2010 world tour. David Wild, contributing editor at Rolling Stone magazine, said of Classics Live: "...An utterly inspired collection of live performances of the best-loved songs that Roger Hodgson has written and sung to date, Classics Live reminds us in the most vivid way who brought the world such beloved rock standards as "Give a Little Bit", "Take the Long Way Home", "The Logical Song" and "Dreamer" and why these shining songs endure as deeply personal yet somehow universal expression of longing, love and our endless search for human connection."

The successor to Classics Live − Classics Live 2 − was mentioned by Roger Hodgson throughout the 2010s, and was formally announced on his website in 2019, to be sold during his 2020 tour, but those concerts were cancelled due to COVID-19, meaning that Classics Live 2 remains unreleased.

== Track listing ==
All songs written by Roger Hodgson.

1. "Take the Long Way Home" 4:55
  - Belo Horizonte, Brazil with band
2. "Give a Little Bit" 4:21
  - Oslo, Norway with band
3. "Hide in Your Shell" 6:59
  - Valencia, Venezuela with band
4. "Breakfast in America" 2:43
  - Belo Horizonte, Brazil with band
5. "Only Because of You" / "Lord Is It Mine" 6:00
  - Solo in Paris, France
6. "The Logical Song" 4:09
  - Belo Horizonte, Brazil with band
7. "School" 5:48
  - Babelsberg, Germany with orchestra
8. "Dreamer" 4:34
  - Valencia, Venezuela with band
9. "Two of Us" 2:43
  - Solo in Bremen, Germany
10. "It's Raining Again" 4:44
  - Belo Horizonte, Brazil with band

== Personnel ==
- Roger Hodgson: vocals, 12 string guitar, piano, keyboards
- Kevin Adamson: keyboards, backing vocals
- Aaron MacDonald: saxophones, keyboards, melodica, backing vocals
- Ian Stewart: bass
- Bryan Head: drums

== Production ==
- Producer: Roger Hodgson
- Recording engineer: Howard Heckers
- Mixing engineer: Denis Tougas
- Assisted by: Marc Eijkelenboom
- Mastering engineer: George Seara
- Mixed at Phase One Studios, Toronto
