= Pavillon de Paris =

French large concert space, closed in 1980

Coordinates: 48°53′34″N 2°23′35″E

The Pavillon de Paris (French pronunciation: [pavijɔ̃ d(ə) paʁi]) was a large concert space in Paris, France, located near the Porte de Pantin Métro stop, on the northern edge of the city. With a seating capacity of approximately 10,000 spectators, the Pavillon was the city's largest indoor music arena throughout its brief operating history from September 1975 until 1980. The Pavillon was opened as a music venue at the initiative of KCP (Koski-Cauchoix Productions), who had previously struggled to present rock concerts in smaller, less suitable venues, most notably the Palais des Sports de Paris.

Many famous rock and pop bands performed at the Pavillon when their tours visited Paris, including Genesis, The Who, ABBA, AC/DC, Pink Floyd, Supertramp, Kansas, Bob Marley, Paul McCartney & Wings, Queen, The Rolling Stones, Ringo Starr, Aretha Franklin, Neil Young, Earth, Wind & Fire, David Bowie, Iggy Pop, Bob Seger and the perennial French rocker, Johnny Hallyday.

The industrial-looking building that housed the concert space was previously used by a slaughterhouse and meat-packing business, and the surrounding La Villette area was well known as a traditional meat-packing district. As a result, the Pavillon de Paris was also known colloquially as Les Abattoirs (The Slaughterhouse), and some of the acts who recorded live performances at the Pavillon chose to refer to the venue as the "Abattoirs". For example, the French film-maker Freddy Hausser made a film of The Rolling Stones performing at the Pavillon that is titled Les Stones aux abattoirs (The Stones at the Slaughterhouse).

In 1980, the Pavillon de Paris was closed, and for the next three years, most touring rock bands appeared at the Hippodrome de Pantin in the nearby Parc de la Villette. In 1983, the Hippodrome was itself replaced by Le Zénith de Paris.

== Performance chronology ==
- 1975: Alice Cooper (16 September), Poco + America (27 September), Santana + Earth, Wind & Fire (13 October), Blue Öyster Cult (3 November)
- 1976 : Ange (20 February), The Who (1–2 March), Return to Forever (7 March), Neil Young & Crazy Horse (23 March), Paul McCartney & Wings (26 March), Fats Domino (27 March), Jethro Tull (3 May), David Crosby & Graham Nash (13 May), Au Bonheur Des Dames + Catherine Ribeiro & Alpes (15 May), David Bowie (17–19 May), Rick Wakeman (1 June), The Rolling Stones (4–7 June), Genesis (23-24 June), Kraftwerk (30 September), The Sensational Alex Harvey Band (2 October), Gentle Giant + Banco del Mutuo Soccorso (5 October), Marvin Gaye (11 October), Rainbow + AC/DC (13 October) Robin Trower & Thin Lizzy (18 October), Patti Smith & John Cale (19 October), Status Quo (23 October), Poco (30 October), Aerosmith (1 November), Larry Coryell (3 November), Dr. Feelgood (6 November), Peter Frampton (8 November), The Marshall Tucker Band (22 November), Rod Stewart (23 November), The Flamin' Groovies (2 December), Santana + Journey (5–7 December), Sutherland Brothers & Quiver (17 December)
- 1977 : Todd Rundgren (18 January), Procol Harum (28 January), Status Quo (31 January), Frank Zappa (2 February), Hall & Oates (10 February), Pink Floyd (22–25 February), Bryan Ferry (4 March), Paice Ashton Lord (20 March), Ted Nugent + Streetwalkers (21 March), Fats Domino (27 March), Jack Bruce (1 April), Black Sabbath + AC/DC (5 April), Lou Reed (13–14 April), Fleetwood Mac (18 April), Eddie and the Hot Rods (24 April), Tom Waits (28 April), Roger McGuinn (7 May), Klaus Schulze (8 May), Bob Marley & The Wailers (10 May), Chuck Berry (11 May), John Mayall (16 May), Jean-Luc Ponty & Larry Coryell (26 May), Tom Petty + Nils Lofgren + The Kinks (1 June), Genesis (11–14 June), Eric Clapton (14 June), Iggy Pop (23 September), Weather Report (29 September), Supertramp + Harmonium (30 September), Herbie Hancock (17 October), Donna Summer (20 October), Vladimir Vysotsky (26 October), Rainbow (27 October), Bob Seger (3 November), Joan Baez (14 November), Yes (5–6 December), 10cc (12 December), Téléphone (16 December)
- 1978 : Alan Stivell (3 February), Tina Turner (5 February), Frank Zappa (6-7 & 9 February), Kansas + Cheap Trick (23 March), Patti Smith (26 March), Hot Tuna (27 March), Uriah Heep (1 April), Return to Forever (3 April), Queen (23–24 April), Alvin Lee & Ten Years After (26 April), Blue Öyster Cult + John Cougar Mellencamp (8 May), Santana (12 May), Electric Light Orchestra (15 May), Squeeze + Styx (22 May), David Bowie (24–25 May), Vangelis (19 June), Bob Marley & The Wailers (25–27 June), Jefferson Starship (28 June), Bob Dylan (3–8 July), Weather Report (4 October), Doobie Brothers (20 October), Rory Gallagher (23 October), Eric Clapton + Muddy Waters (18 November), Rod Stewart (26 November), Cerrone (1–2 December), Santana (4–7 December)
- 1979 : John McLaughlin, Paco DeLucia & Larry Coryell (31 January), U.K. (11 February), Roxy Music (20 February), Queen (27–28 February & 1 March), Earth, Wind & Fire (17 March), Lou Reed (2 April), Ted Nugent (29 April), The Who (16–17 May), John Mayall (22 May), Alice Cooper (2 June), Peter Tosh (6 June), Van Halen (22 June), Herbie Hancock & Chick Corea (3 July), The Tubes + Squeeze (2 July), Jeff Beck & Stanley Clarke (3 July), Weather Report (5 July), Chic (28 September), Aswad + I-Roy (29 September), Boney M (30 September), James Brown (5 October), Boston (8 October), Johnny Hallyday (18 October – 25 November), Leonard Cohen (22 October), ABBA (23 October), John McLaughlin, Jack Bruce, Billy Cobham & Stu Goldberg (29 October), Supertramp (29–30 November & 1 December), AC/DC + Judas Priest (9 December, 2 shows, 4pm & 8pm)
- 1980 : Trust (12 January), Blondie (15 January), Roxy Music (2 June)

== Live albums recorded at the Pavillon de Paris ==
- The Rolling Stones – Love You Live (1977) : the tracks "Honky Tonk Women", "Happy", "Hot Stuff", "Star Star", "Tumbling Dice", "You Gotta Move", "You Can't Always Get What You Want", "Brown Sugar", and "Jumpin' Jack Flash" were recorded at the Pavillon de Paris, 4 to 7 June 1976
- Genesis – Seconds Out (1977) : one track, "The Cinema Show", was recorded at the Pavillon de Paris concerts of June 1976 (the rest of the album was recorded the following year, also in Paris, but at the Palais des Sports)
- Santana – Moonflower (1977) : almost all of side 2 of this double-album was recorded at the Pavillon on 6 and 7 December 1976
- Bob Marley & The Wailers – Babylon By Bus : recorded mainly (if not entirely, despite the credits) at the Pavillon, 25 to 27 June 1978
- Cerrone – Cerrone In Concert (1979): a double-album recorded at the Pavillon on 1 and 2 December 1978
- Queen – Live Killers (1979) : a few brief passages (in "Get Down Make Love", "Love of My Life" and "Brighton Rock") were recorded at the Pavillon between 27 February and 1 March 1979
- Johnny Hallyday – DVD Live : Pavillon de Paris filmed at Pavillon between 18 and 25 October 1979
- Supertramp – Paris (1980), a double album recorded at the Pavillon de Paris on 29 November 1979
- AC/DC – Let There Be Rock: The Movie – Live in Paris recorded on 9 December 1979
