= Roger Hodgson =

English singer and songwriter (born 1950)

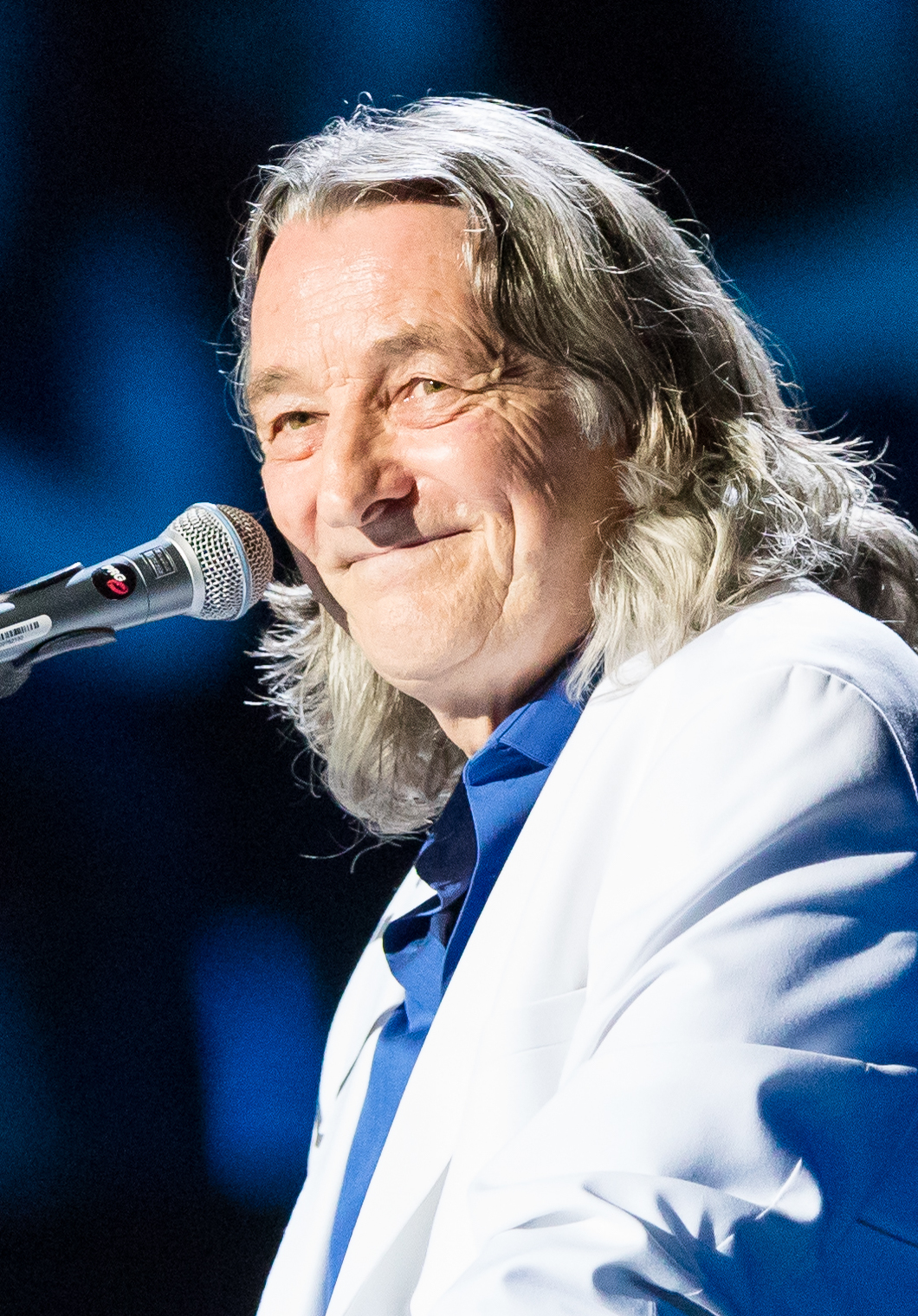
- Hodgson in 2017

Background information
- Born: Charles Roger Pomfret Hodgson; 21 March 1950 (age 76); Portsmouth, Hampshire, England
- Origin: Oxford, England
- Genres: Progressive rock; pop rock; art rock; soft rock
- Occupations: Singer; musician; songwriter
- Instruments: Vocals; keyboards; guitar; bass
- Years active: 1969–present
- Labels: A&M; Unichord/Voiceprint; Epic; Eagle Vision; Universal
- Formerly of: Argosy; Supertramp; Ringo Starr & His All-Starr Band
- Website: RogerHodgson.com

Charles Roger Pomfret Hodgson (born 21 March 1950) is an English singer, musician and songwriter. He is best known as a founding member and former co-frontman of the rock band Supertramp. He wrote or co-wrote and sang the majority of the band’s hits including "Dreamer", "Give a Little Bit", "Take the Long Way Home", "The Logical Song", "It's Raining Again", and "Breakfast in America".

In 1983, Hodgson left Supertramp. After releasing two solo albums in 1984 and 1987, he took a break from his music career to spend time with his children as they were growing up. He returned to touring in 1997, and released a third solo album in 2000.

Hodgson often writes about spiritual and philosophical topics, and his lyrics have been described as personal and meaningful.

== Biography ==
=== 1950–1969: early years ===
Hodgson was born in Portsmouth, Hampshire, England, on 21 March 1950, the son of Charles and Jill Hodgson (née Pomfret), and grew up in Oxford. He attended prep school Woodcote House School near Windlesham, Surrey, where he was the first boy to learn electric guitar, and public school Stowe School near Buckingham. Hodgson's first guitar, given to him when he was 12, was a parting gift from his father when his parents divorced. He took it to boarding school with him, where his teacher taught him three chords. He began composing his own music and lyrics and within a year gave his first concert at school with nine original songs at the age of 13. Hodgson's first band at school consisted of him on guitar and his friend Roy Hovey playing snare drums. They were dubbed the "H-bombs" because of their last names.

When aged 19, Hodgson made his first appearance in a recording studio as guitarist for People Like Us, a band he joined shortly after leaving boarding school. The group recorded a single, "Duck Pond" and its B-side "Send Me No Flowers", which was never released.

=== 1969: Argosy ===
After People Like Us disbanded, Hodgson auditioned for Island Records, with Traffic's road manager providing him a foot in the door with the label. Island set him up in a recording studio as vocalist for the one-off "flower power" pop band Argosy, which also included Reginald Dwight (later known as Elton John), Caleb Quaye and Nigel Olsson. Their sole single, "Mr. Boyd" and B-side "Imagine", consisted of two pieces of orchestrated pop (both penned by Hodgson) and was issued in 1969 on the DJM (UK) and Congress (US) record labels. "Mr. Boyd" was covered in 1997 by Jake Shillingford and his band My Life Story on their album The Golden Mile.

=== 1969–1983: Supertramp ===
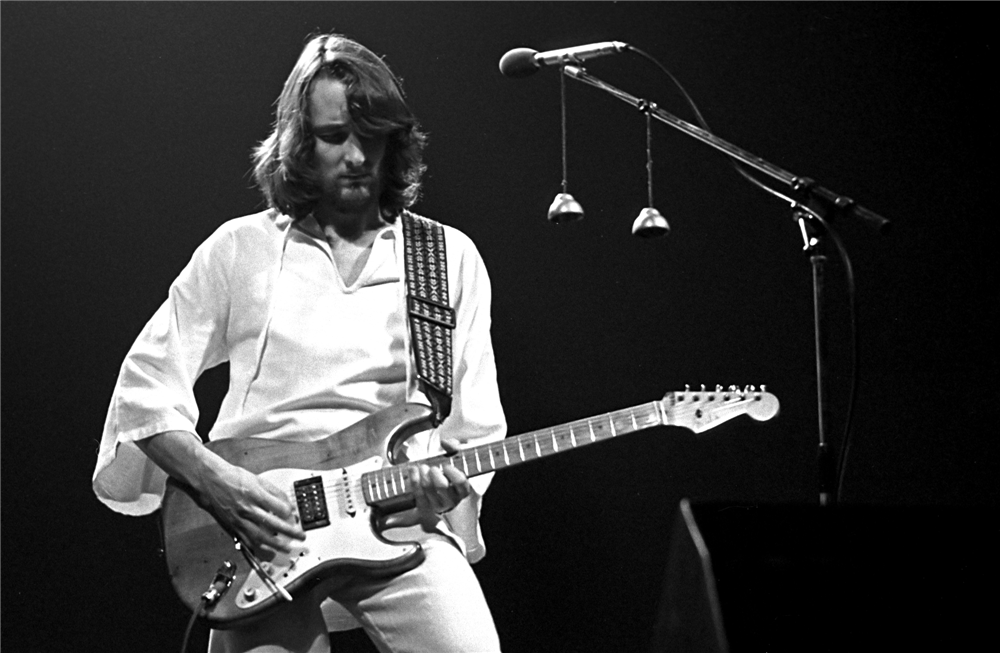
Roger Hodgson in 1979

After the break-up of Argosy, Hodgson, responding to an advertisement placed in Melody Maker by Rick Davies, auditioned for the guitarist spot in the progressive rock band Supertramp. Similar to fellow British prog rockers Genesis' search for a new lead vocalist, 93 guitarists auditioned before Hodgson was chosen for the role, but when Richard Palmer arrived the next day to audition for the same spot, Hodgson agreed to learn bass instead.

All the songs on Supertramp's self-titled first album, released in 1970, were composed by Hodgson, Davies, and Palmer. Hodgson and Davies collaborated on the composing while Palmer wrote the lyrics. Palmer left shortly after the album's recording, allowing Hodgson to switch back to guitar (as well as providing keyboards with Davies). From their second album Indelibly Stamped forward, Hodgson and Davies wrote separately with each singing lead vocals on their own compositions. Crime of the Century, released in 1974, was the first of their albums to feature the line-up of Hodgson, Davies and new members Bob Siebenberg (drums), Dougie Thomson (bass) and John Helliwell (saxophone, clarinet, keyboards, backing vocals).

This line-up would remain unchanged for the remainder of Hodgson's tenure in the group. Hodgson's song "Dreamer" became the band's first hit and drove the album to the tops of the charts. It was one of the first keyboard songs Hodgson wrote on his new Wurlitzer piano that he bought when he was 19 years old. "Dreamer" was written after setting the keyboard up at his mother's house, at the first opportunity he had to play it.

At the time, Hodgson had a two-track tape recorder and made a "very magical" demo of the song on the spot with multiple vocal harmonies, using tin cans, lampshades and cardboard boxes for percussion. He has said he loves playing the song in concert because it "just brings out the dreamer in everyone. So often we let go of that side of ourselves and it kind of reminds the audience and reminds me when I'm singing it, too, to keep that place in us alive." The follow-up Crisis? What Crisis?, their first album to be recorded in the US, was released in 1975. The album charted on both the UK Top Twenty and the US Top Fifty.

By their 1977 release Even in the Quietest Moments, the band had permanently relocated to the United States. Hodgson's opening song on the album, "Give a Little Bit", became an international hit single (number 15 US, number 29 UK, number 8 in Canada) and was written at 19 or 20 years of age; he introduced it to the band for recording five to six years later. Hodgson has stated the song was inspired by the Beatles' "All You Need Is Love", released during the love and peace movement of the 1960s. Diana, Princess of Wales loved the song, and Hodgson performed it in her honour at the 2007 Concert for Diana at Wembley Stadium. Hodgson said of the performance: "It was very wonderful when the audience all stood up, and the [two] princes also, to sing 'Give a Little Bit' with me. That was a magical moment." Hodgson has said it is a wonderful feeling as an artist to close his concerts with the song: "I look out and people just start hugging each other and they start singing with me. It's a very unifying song with a beautiful, simple message that I'm very proud of and really enjoy playing today."

Supertramp released their most successful album, Breakfast in America, in 1979; by 2010 it had sold over 20 million copies. From that same album, "The Logical Song", written by Hodgson, is Supertramp's biggest chart hit in both the US and UK. In 1980, Hodgson was honoured with the Ivor Novello Award from the British Academy of Composers and Songwriters for "The Logical Song" being named the best song both musically and lyrically. To this day, "The Logical Song" also has the distinction of being one of the most quoted lyrics in schools. Hodgson composed the song from an autobiographical point of view, inspired by his experience of being sent away to boarding school for ten years. In interviews in the mid-2010s, Hodgson has said of the song's meaning that it was "born from my questions about what really matters in life. Throughout childhood we are taught all these ways to be and yet we are rarely told anything about our true self. We are taught how to function outwardly, but not guided to who we are inwardly. We go from the innocence and wonder of childhood to the confusion of adolescence that often ends in the cynicism and disillusionment of adulthood. In 'The Logical Song', the burning question that came down to its rawest place was 'please tell me who I am,' and that's basically what the song is about. I think this eternal question continues to hit such a deep chord in people around the world and why it stays so meaningful."

"Breakfast in America" was written by a young Roger before joining Supertramp. An error on a demo copy credits Rick Davies as the writer, but an addendum corrects it prior to the album's release. Hodgson has said that he wrote it during his late teens at a time when he "had a lot of dreams" and that it "still brings a smile to his face" when he sings it on stage. Prior to writing the song, he was driven to find a harmonium (also known as a pump organ); he found one at an elderly woman's house in a village in the English countryside, which he bought for 24 pounds. Hodgson brought it home and proceeded to write many songs on it immediately, "Breakfast in America" being one of them - because the harmonium "had a magical quality to it and still does". He had the lyrics written in about an hour in a "stream-of-consciousness" fashion, expressed from a "real joyful, playful place he was in at the time", while "dreaming of having kippers for breakfast to flying to America and seeing the girls in California, among other things". Hodgson still has the instrument today. The sound on the record is the original harmonium and a grand piano.

The live album Paris was released in 1980. ...Famous Last Words..., released in 1982, included Hodgson's compositions "It's Raining Again", "Don't Leave Me Now", "C'est le Bon", "Know Who You Are" and "Crazy".

Hodgson wrote hits such as "Give a Little Bit", "It's Raining Again", "Take the Long Way Home", "Dreamer", and "Fool's Overture".

In 1981, Hodgson moved his family from Los Angeles to northern California, where he built a home studio and began contemplating solo recordings. The rest of Supertramp remained in Los Angeles and the geographic separation created a rift between them and Hodgson; feuding was virtually non-existent, but the group harmony was lost. Hodgson felt increasingly constrained in the group context, and during the tour for ...Famous Last Words... he made the decision to leave Supertramp. He has denied any real problems in his relationship with Davies as speculated.

=== 1984–present: solo career ===
Roger Hodgson recorded three solo albums at his new home studio, the first before his departure from Supertramp. Titled Sleeping With the Enemy, it was cut in the months between the release of ...Famous Last Words... and its supporting tour, and mixed during Supertramp rehearsals for the tour in hopes of fitting in some solo promotion while on the road. However, at the last minute Hodgson had second thoughts about the album's quality and decided to scrap it, planning to record a new and better album after his last tour with Supertramp.

In the Eye of the Storm, released in late September 1984, would prove to be Hodgson's biggest success without the group. The album became an international hit, selling over two million copies. The single "Had a Dream (Sleeping With the Enemy)" peaked at number 48 on Billboard's Hot 100 charts and number 11 on Billboard's Mainstream Rock Tracks chart, and the follow-up single "In Jeopardy" peaked at number 30.

Hodgson's second album was Hai Hai (1987). However, just prior to the album's release, Hodgson fell from a loft in his home and broke both wrists, which kept him from promoting the album. Doctors told Hodgson that he would never play music again, but he was doing so within a year and a half. He decided to take a long break from both touring and recording to spend more time with his children.

In 1990, Hodgson declined an offer from Yes to join them as lead vocalist. One of the songs he co-wrote with Trevor Rabin, "Walls", appears on Yes' 1994 Talk album, with lyrics revised by Jon Anderson. A version of "Walls" with only Hodgson and Rabin on vocals was released on Rabin's 2003 archival release 90124.

After a long break, Hodgson launched into his first tour in over ten years, and released 1997's Rites of Passage to document the tour. The live album was recorded at the Miners Foundry in Nevada City, California. He performed with a full band that included his son Andrew and Supertramp saxophonist John Helliwell. The album did not chart in the UK or the US, though it did reach No. 34 in Germany.

Hodgson played King Arthur in the rock opera Excalibur: La Legende Des Celtes and appeared on the album for two songs: "The Elements" and "The Will of God". The project was headed by Alan Simon and released in 1999. In 2000, Hodgson contributed vocals on the track "The Moon Says Hello" by Carlos Núñez, on the CD Mayo Longo.

Hodgson's fourth solo effort, Open the Door, was released in 2000 and continued in the vein of his previous work. He collaborated again with Alan Simon on the album. AllMusic said of the album, "Fans will be delighted to hear Hodgson returning to the craft of writing high-quality songs" ... "Open the Door is the closest thing to Supertramp since ...Famous Last Words... ." In August 2000, Hodgson guested with Fairport Convention at that year's Cropredy Festival. He performed "Breakfast in America", "The Logical Song", "Open the Door" and "Give A Little Bit".

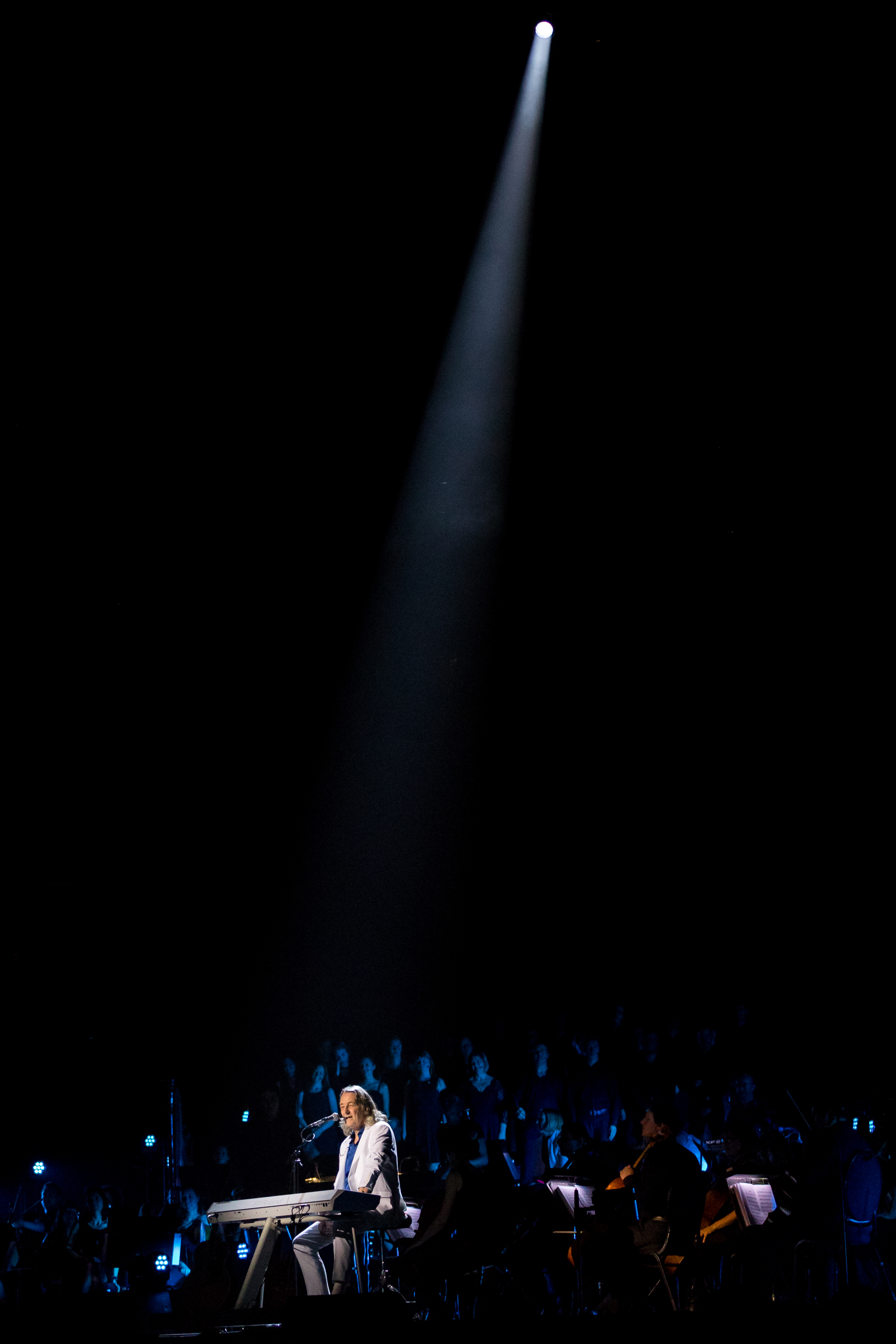
Roger Hodgson in 2017

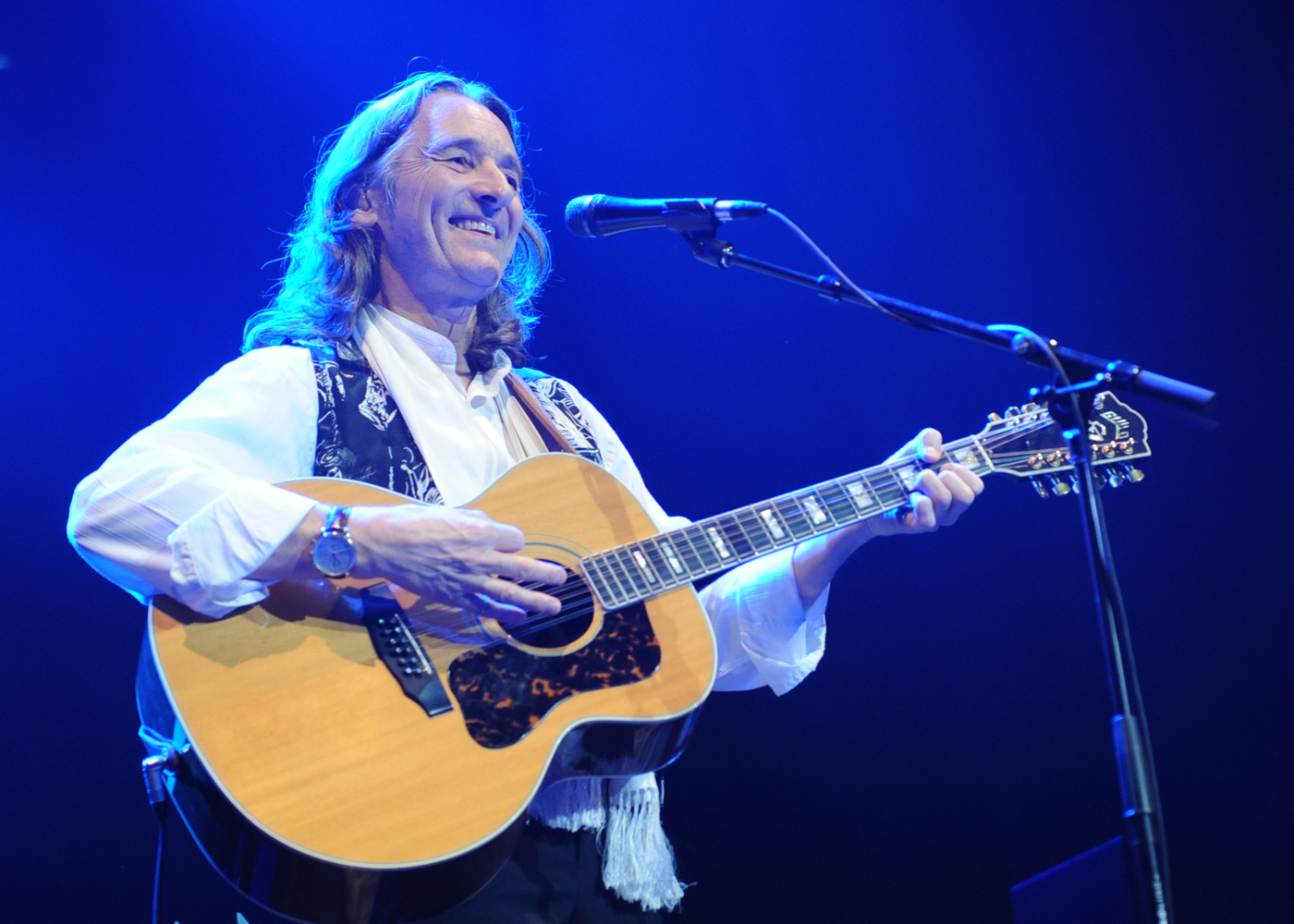
Roger Hodgson performing on his Breakfast in America World Tour.

In 2001, Hodgson toured as a member of Ringo Starr & His All-Starr Band playing guitar and singing, and has since collaborated with Trevor Rabin (who appears on the track "The More I Look" on Open the Door).

Hodgson continued touring, often playing alone, and frequently joined by his band or a full orchestra. He took part in the Night of the Proms concert series in Belgium and Germany in late 2004, as well as the rock festival Bospop in 2005 with return performances in 2011, 2013 and 2017. On 30 November 2005, he held his first concert in England in over 20 years at Shepherd's Bush, London. While the performance was filmed and scheduled for a DVD release, the plan was scrapped. Instead, the concert recorded at the Place Des Arts in Montreal, Canada on 6 June 2006 was his first DVD, released on 22 August 2006, entitled Take the Long Way Home—Live in Montreal. In October 2006, the DVD was certified multi-platinum by the Canadian Recording Industry Association.

In May 2006, Hodgson was honored by ASCAP in recognition of his song "Give A Little Bit" being one of the most played songs in the ASCAP repertoire in 2005. He received another ASCAP award on 9 April 2008 for the Gym Class Heroes' song "Cupid's Chokehold", a remake of Hodgson's "Breakfast in America", recognized as one of the most played songs in ASCAP's repertoire in 2007.

Hodgson participated as a mentor on Canadian Idol along with Dennis DeYoung. He continued mentoring several of the finalists during his 2006 Canadian tour.

Hodgson performed at the Concert for Diana at Wembley Stadium, on 1 July 2007. He sang a medley of his most popular songs: "Dreamer", "The Logical Song", "Breakfast in America" and "Give A Little Bit".

On 18 September 2007, the DVD Take the Long Way Home—Live in Montreal was released worldwide, achieving Platinum status in just seven weeks, reaching No. 1 in all Canada, and multi-Platinum and Gold in France and Germany.

Hodgson toured the US, Australia, New Zealand, South America, Europe and Canada in 2010. Though Hodgson's former bandmates in Supertramp announced a 40th anniversary reunion tour, he was not invited. Hodgson's Classics Live is a collection of recordings taken from solo, band and orchestra shows from his 2010 world tour. In May 2012, Hodgson was honored by France as a Knight of the Order of Arts and Letters. This decoration was established in 1957 by the French Minister of Culture to recognize significant contributions to the arts.

Hodgson continued to tour worldwide from 2011-16, including two concerts at the Royal Albert Hall, and in 2017 with dates in Argentina, Uruguay, Brazil, the UK, Netherlands, France, Germany, Switzerland, Belgium, Spain, Monaco and Canada. In December 2017, he toured with Night of the Proms for 17 shows in Germany and Luxembourg. He was accompanied by saxophonist Michael Ghegan; Emily Bear performed "School" with him. As related by Subba-Cultcha magazine about Hodgson's concerts: "Alternating between electric keys, a grand piano and several guitars, Hodgson effortlessly weaves the music around his audience giving an almost cathartic emotional release in some cases" ... "His instantly recognisable voice and pulsating keys are in as fine a form as you will hear, and the genuine friendliness and personality of Hodgson, comes across in waves from stage to audience." During his concerts, Hodgson often shares stories with the audience of how his songs were written and "connects deeply with the fans in a way few stars of his stature do".

In 2018, Hodgson kicked off his Breakfast in America world tour, in honour of the 40th anniversary of Supertramp's Breakfast in America album. Rolling Stone reviewed the tour favourably.

On 4 June 2019, he was decorated with the Order of Arts and Letters by Franck Riester, French minister of Culture, in Paris during a tour at the Olympia.

== Tours ==
- Breakfast in America Tour (2012–2017)
- Breakfast in America 40th Anniversary World Tour (2019–2020)

== Discography ==
=== Solo studio albums ===
- In the Eye of the Storm (1984)
- Hai Hai (1987)
- Open the Door (2000)

=== Live albums ===
- Rites of Passage (1997)
- Classics Live (2010)

=== With Supertramp ===
- Supertramp (1970)
- Indelibly Stamped (1971)
- Crime of the Century (1974)
- Crisis? What Crisis? (1975)
- Even in the Quietest Moments... (1977)
- Breakfast in America (1979)
- Paris (1980)
- ...Famous Last Words... (1982)
- Live in Paris '79 (expanded version of other Paris) (2025)
