= Peter Henderson (music producer) =

British record producer and audio engineer (born 1955)

- Born: 1 January 1955 (age 71); Hertfordshire, United Kingdom
- Genres: Rock, pop
- Occupations: Record producer, audio engineer
- Years active: 1974–present

Peter Henderson (born 1 January 1955 in Hemel Hempstead, Hertfordshire) is a British record producer and audio engineer. In the early 1970s, he began his career at Air Studios, where he worked as an assistant to Geoff Emerick. Over the years, he has collaborated with several prominent artists and bands, including Wings, Supertramp, Climax Blues Band, Frank Zappa, and Paul McCartney. His work has also taken him to the United States, where he has contributed to projects for Rush, the Tubes, and others as an engineer and mixer. He has two Grammy Award nominations, with one win (Best Engineered Recording - Non-classical in 1979) for Breakfast in America.

== Discography ==
Source: Allmusic

- 1974: King Crimson – Starless and Bible Black (assistant engineer)
- 1974: America – Holiday (tape operator)
- 1975: Ian Hunter – Ian Hunter (assistant engineer)
- 1976: Jeff Beck – Wired (engineer)
- 1976: Wings – Wings at the Speed of Sound (engineer)
- 1976: Nektar – Recycled (tape operator)
- 1977: Supertramp - Even in the Quietest Moments (engineer)
- 1977: Split Enz – Dizrythima (engineer)
- 1977: Neil Sedaka – A Song (engineer)
- 1977: Bert Jansch – A Rare Conundrum (engineer)
- 1978: The Tubes – What Do You Want from Live (producer, engineer)
- 1978: Wings – London Town (assistant engineer)
- 1978: Ozark Mountain Daredevils – Don't Look Down (engineer)
- 1979: Sammy Hagar – Street Machine (engineer)
- 1979: Frank Zappa – Sheik Yerbouti (engineer)
- 1979: Supertramp – Breakfast in America (producer, engineer, mixing)
- 1980: Supertramp – Paris (producer, engineer)
- 1982: Supertramp – Famous Last Words (producer, engineer)
- 1984: Rush – Grace Under Pressure (producer, engineer)
- 1985: Real Life – Flame (producer)
- 1985: The Lucy Show – ...undone (remastering)
- 1987: The Mercy Seat – The Mercy Seat (mastering, assistant engineer)
- 1988: Paul McCartney – CHOBA B CCCP (engineer)
- 1989: Then Jerico – The Big Area (producer, engineer)
- 1989: Tina Turner – Foreign Affair (original engineering)
- 1989: Paul McCartney – Flowers in the Dirt (producer, engineer, programming, computers)
- 1990: Paul McCartney – Tripping the Live Fantastic (producer)
- 1990: The Raindogs – Lost Souls (producer, engineer, keyboards)
- 1992: Chris Bell – I Am the Cosmos (engineer)
- 1997: Paul McCartney – Flaming Pie (mixing engineer)
- 2006: The Beauty Room – The Beauty Room (drum engineering)
- 2007: Kevin Ayers – The Unfairground (producer, associate producer, mixing)
- 2011: Frank Zappa – Hammersmith Odeon (engineer)
- 2013: Alex Hepburn – Together Alone (recording)
- 2013: Josh Krajcik – Blindly, Lonely, Lovely (engineer)
