= Supertramp =

British rock band

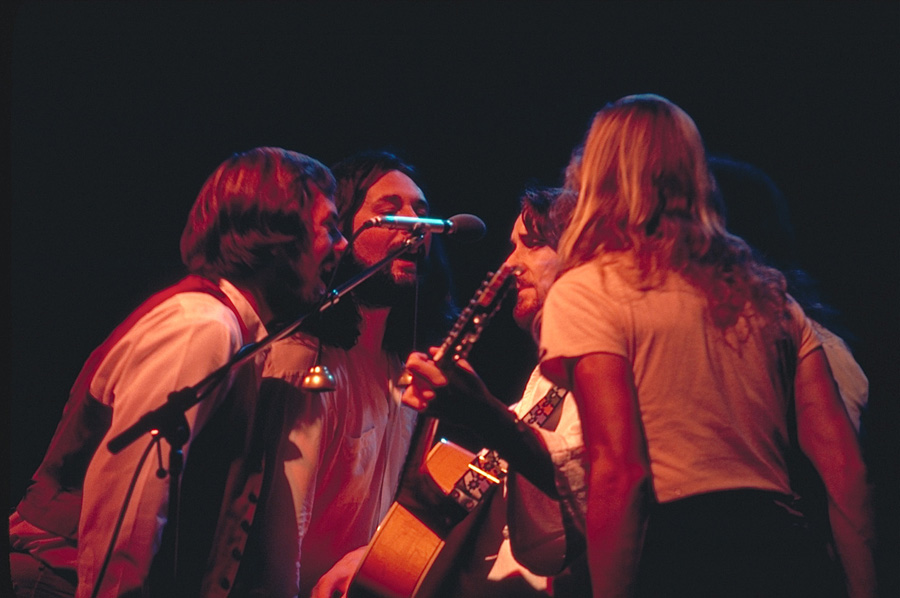
- Supertramp in 1979; From left to right: Dougie Thomson, Rick Davies, Roger Hodgson, John Helliwell. Hidden: Bob Siebenberg

Background information
- Origin: London, England
- Genres: Progressive rock; progressive pop; soft rock; pop
- Years active: 1970–1988; 1993; 1996–2002; 2010–2012
- Labels: A&M; Oxygen; EMI; Super Cab; Chrysalis
- Past members: Rick Davies; Roger Hodgson; Richard Palmer; Dougie Thomson; Robert Millar; Dave Winthrop; Kevin Currie; Frank Farrell; Bob Siebenberg; John Helliwell; Mark Hart; Carl Verheyen; Tom Walsh; Cliff Hugo; Lee Thornburg; Jesse Siebenberg
- Website: supertramp.com
- Logo

Supertramp were a British rock band formed in London in 1970. Marked by the individual songwriting of founders Roger Hodgson (vocals, keyboards and guitars) and Rick Davies (vocals and keyboards), the group were distinguished for blending progressive rock and pop styles. The classic lineup, which lasted ten years from 1973 to 1983, consisted of Davies, Hodgson, Dougie Thomson (bass), Bob Siebenberg (drums) and John Helliwell (saxophone), after which the group's lineup changed numerous times, with Davies being the only constant member throughout its history.

Supertramp found no success with their first two albums, but after a lineup change into what became their classic lineup, their third album, Crime of the Century (1974), was their breakthrough. Initially a more experimental prog-rock group, they began moving towards a more pop-oriented sound with the album. The band reached their commercial peak with 1979's Breakfast in America, which yielded the international top 10 singles "The Logical Song", "Breakfast in America", "Goodbye Stranger" and "Take the Long Way Home". Their other top 40 hits included "Dreamer" (1974), "Give a Little Bit" (1977) and "It's Raining Again" (1982).

In 1982 Supertramp released ...Famous Last Words..., the last album to feature Hodgson, who left in 1983 to pursue a solo career. The band continued with Davies as the sole leader and released two more albums until 1988. After this, they disbanded for a time and periodically reformed in various configurations (always with Davies, and without Hodgson), recording and touring two further albums, Some Things Never Change (1997) and Slow Motion (2002). Davies died in 2025.

Supertramp attained significant popularity in North America, Europe, South Africa, and Australia. Their highest sales levels were in Canada, where they had two diamond-certified (ten-times platinum) albums (Crime of the Century and Breakfast in America), and their only number one singles anywhere ("The Logical Song" and "Dreamer") aside from "It's Raining Again" which reached number one in France. As of 2007, Supertramp album sales exceeded 60 million.

== History ==
=== 1969–1972: Formation, Supertramp and Indelibly Stamped ===
In 1969 Stanley "Sam" August Miesegaes, a Dutch millionaire, ceased providing financial support to a band called The Joint, as he was disappointed with them. He offered Swindon-born keyboardist Rick Davies, a former bandmate of Irish singer-songwriter Gilbert O'Sullivan, whose talent he felt had been "bogged down" by the group, an opportunity to form his own band with Miesegaes's financial backing. The band included Roger Hodgson (bass and vocals), Richard Palmer (guitars and vocals) and Keith Baker (percussion).

Davies and Hodgson had radically different backgrounds and musical inspirations. Davies was working class and fiercely devoted to blues and jazz, while Hodgson had gone straight from English private school to the music business and was fond of pop. Despite this, they hit it off during the auditions and began writing virtually all of their songs together, with Palmer as a third writer in the mix. Hodgson and Davies collaborated on the songwriting while Palmer composed the lyrics.

The group, having dubbed themselves "Daddy", after several months of rehearsal at a country house in West Hythe, Kent, flew to Munich for a series of concerts at the P. N. Club. One 10-minute performance there of "All Along the Watchtower" was filmed by Haro Senft (Daddy Portrait 1970). The rehearsals had been less than productive and their initial repertoire consisted of only four songs, two of which were covers.

In January 1970 Keith Baker left, replaced by former stage actor Robert Millar (b. 2 February 1950 – d. 22 July 2024), and to avoid confusion with "Daddy Longlegs", at Palmer's suggestion, the band changed its name to "Supertramp", a moniker inspired by The Autobiography of a Super-Tramp by William Henry Davies.

In April 1970 Supertramp, while back in Munich, returned the favour to their friend Haro Senft by contributing music to his next film, Purgatory (a.k.a. Fegefeuer), and would also agree to have tracks from their first album used in a documentary, Extremes (1971), by Tony Klinger and Michael Lytton.

Supertramp were one of the first groups to be signed to the UK branch of A&M Records and their first album, Supertramp, was released on 14 August 1970 in the UK and Canada; however, this disc was not issued in the US until late 1977. Stylistically, the album was fairly typical of progressive rock of the era. Despite receiving a good deal of critical praise, the album did not attract a large audience.

Dave Winthrop (flute and saxophone, vocals) had first auditioned for the group in March 1970 but did not join until July, just before the release of the first record. He performed with Supertramp at the 1970 Isle of Wight Festival on 27 August 1970.

The membership continued to evolve in the six months following the album's release. Palmer left the band in December 1970, followed by Millar in January 1971, who had suffered a nervous breakdown. Palmer, as Richard Palmer-James, went on to work as a lyricist for King Crimson. Palmer was replaced by former The Nice guitarist David O'List, who lasted for only one gig. A drummer from Birmingham, Dickie Thomas, was brought in during the interim until auditions brought the band Kevin Currie in February 1971.

South African Russell Pope, who started out working as a roadie for the band and later handled their sound, talks of his first joining them and their early days:

[I joined] on December 28th 1970. Rick and Roger shared a moth eaten flat in Maida Vale, West London, no furniture, just a couple of beds. Richard Palmer had just left, reasons unknown to me. Bob Millar quit soon afterwards, the first of many "Spinal Tap" moments to come. I have a vague memory of David O'List being mentioned by Rick in some scathing way, but if he was involved it must have been for about five minutes. Richard Palmer was already gone when I arrived .... There was no guitarist. The band was a four piece: Roger Hodgson on bass, Rick Davies on organ mostly, Dave Winthrop on sax and flute and Bob Millar on drums. Dave was pretty much the lead singer, Roger sang about a third of the set. Rick didn't sing at all. Very strange line up for a rock band but it worked, although the music had no relevance to who they became in later incarnations. ... I joined Supertramp as an extra pair of hands to load and unload the van. No more, no less. I was broke, freezing and about to be homeless and somebody said "Does anyone want to go to Norway with some band or other for ten pounds a week?" It was a fortune .... I volunteered. Who knew? The infamous Norway expedition started on the 28th of December 1970. We took the ferry from Newcastle to Bergen and the first gig was on December 30th on top of a mountain and the audience mostly arrived on skis. At the end of the show they were all screaming drunk and commenced beating the shit out of each other with chairs. The van stayed on that mountain until the spring of 1971 as it expired after getting up the steep climb. The expedition lasted about ten days in a new rented van, ferries and icy roads with 1,000 feet drops into the fjiords. Beautiful, terrifying. All I could think was "What the hell have I done?"

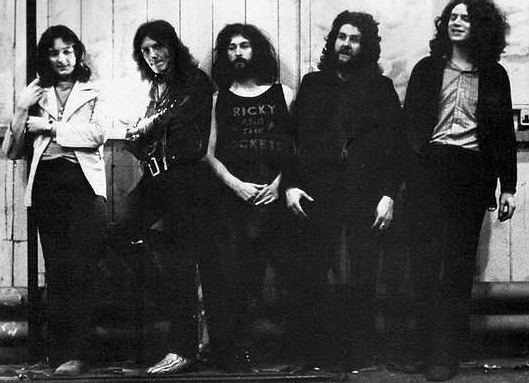
Supertramp in 1971; Left to right: Roger Hodgson, Frank Farrell, Rick Davies, Kevin Curry, Dave Winthrop

For the next album, Indelibly Stamped, released in June 1971 in both the UK and US, Frank Farrell (bass, keyboards, backing vocals) joined, while Hodgson switched to guitar and Davies served as a second lead singer. With Palmer's departure, Hodgson and Davies wrote and composed separately for this and the band's subsequent albums. The record sold even less than their debut. In the aftermath, all members gradually quit except Hodgson and Davies, and Miesegaes withdrew his financial support in October 1972.

=== 1973–1978: Crime of the Century and commercial breakthrough ===
After Farrell's departure in the spring of 1972, 20-year-old bassist Nick South (from Alexis Korner's band) came in for a temporary stint until Dougie Thomson (from The Alan Bown Set) joined in July.

In the summer of 1973 more auditions to replace the departed Currie and Winthrop started and introduced Bob Siebenberg, initially credited as Bob C. Benberg, and another Alan Bown alumnus, John Helliwell, adding saxophone, other woodwinds, occasional keyboards, synthesizers, backing vocals, completing the lineup in the summer of 1973. Hodgson would also begin introducing compositions featuring keyboards, particularly the Wurlitzer electric piano, in the band in addition to guitar. This lineup of Supertramp would remain in place for the next ten years.

Meanwhile, the bond between Davies and Hodgson had begun weakening. Hodgson mused, "There's a very deep bond, but it's definitely mostly on a musical level. When there's just the two of us playing together, there's an incredible empathy. His down-to-earth way of writing, which is very rock 'n' roll, balances out my lighter, melodic style." Over Supertramp's history, their relationship would be amicable but increasingly distant as their lifestyles and musical inclinations drifted apart. Their songwriting partnership gradually dissolved. Although all of Supertramp's songs would continue to be officially credited as "written by Rick Davies and Roger Hodgson", most of them were written individually.

In 1973 a young A&M Records A&R executive, Dave Margereson, was impressed by their new demos and was instrumental in getting them resigned to A&M. By 1974 he had left the label to take over as Supertramp's full-time manager. With money advanced from A&M, the group, with family, friends and crew, moved to a cottage called Southcombe in Somerset, where they spent the rest of 1973 and a good part of 1974 living together and working on material for their third album.

But Supertramp needed a hit record to continue working and finally got one with Crime of the Century. Released in September 1974, it began the group's run of critical and commercial successes, hitting number four in Britain, number 38 in the US and number four in Canada. This album made the top 100 albums in Canada three years in a row in 1974, 1975 and 1976, even though it did not have a Top 40 hit in Canada. "Dreamer", the 1975 UK Top 20 single written by Hodgson, was the band's first hit single and drove the album to the top of the charts. Another single from the record, "Bloody Well Right", hit the US Top 40 in May 1975 and would be their only hit in the country for more than two years.

With a hit album under their belt, pressures on the band increased and the follow-up Crisis? What Crisis? had to be recorded in the few months between two scheduled concert tours. As a consequence, most of the material consisted of leftover songs from Crime of the Century. Decades later the band would continue to regard the album as one of their worst moments. Nevertheless, Hodgson said in a 2015 interview that Crisis? What Crisis? was his favourite Supertramp album. Despite Supertramp's own misgivings, the album was well received by critics. When released in November 1975, it broke both the UK Top 20 and the US Top 50 in spite of its singles all being commercial flops.

The following album, Even in the Quietest Moments..., released in April 1977, spawned a hit single with "Give a Little Bit" (number 15 US, number 29 UK, number eight in Canada), first written by Hodgson at 19 or 20 years of age before he introduced it to the band for recording five to six years later. As usual, the popularity of the album itself eclipsed that of its singles and Even in the Quietest Moments... hit number 16 in the US, number 12 in the UK and number one in Canada. During this period, the band permanently relocated to Los Angeles.

=== 1979–1983: Breakfast in America, ...Famous Last Words... and Hodgson's departure ===
"The Logical Song" (1979)
Lead single from Breakfast in America.

The band's switch to a more pop-oriented approach peaked with their most popular album, Breakfast in America. For the last two months of completing the album, Hodgson parked a camper outside the studio to work diligently on mixing, with brief periods of rest. He remembered feeling that "it could be a big album" and that he spent "days and sometimes weeks choosing the right songs and the right order of songs so one song flowed into the next".

Released in March 1979, Breakfast in America reached number three in the UK and number one in the US and Canada. The album spawned four successful singles (more than their first five albums combined): three of Hodgson's songs, "The Logical Song" (number one Canada, number six US, number seven UK), "Take the Long Way Home" (number four Canada, number 10 US, not released in UK) and "Breakfast in America" (number nine UK, not released in the US or Canada) and Davies's "Goodbye Stranger" (number five in Canada, number 15 US, number 57 UK).

To avoid an overly long gap between albums during their hiatus, the band put out 1980's Paris, a two-LP live album recorded mostly at the Pavillon de Paris in November 1979, towards the tail end of their 1979 ten month tour. It broke the top ten in both the US and UK. A live version of "Dreamer" was released as a single hitting number one in Canada and number 15 in the US, even though the studio version had failed to even chart there in 1974. A second single from the live album, "Breakfast in America", peaked at number 62 in the US.

Hodgson moved his family from the Los Angeles area to the mountains of northern California, where he built a home and studio and focused on his family and spiritual life, while recording a solo album, initially titled Sleeping with the Enemy, which was later released as In the Eye of the Storm in 1984. This geographical separation widened the rift between him and the rest of the group; during the conceptualisation and recording of their next album, ...Famous Last Words..., Davies and Hodgson found far greater difficulty in reconciling their musical ideas than they had before, and it was apparent to the rest of the band that Hodgson wanted out.

...Famous Last Words... was released in October 1982 and scored two more hits with "It's Raining Again" and "My Kind of Lady". It peaked at number 5 in the USA and number 6 in the UK.

A world tour followed in 1983, on which the band was joined by two additional musicians on stage, former Alice Cooper and Queen player Fred Mandel (guitar, keyboards, synthesisers, backing vocals) and Scott Page (sax, guitar, horns, backing vocals), and Hodgson announced he would not be continuing with the band once the tour finished in September 1983. Hodgson has stated that his departure was motivated by a desire to spend more time with his family and make solo recordings and that there were never any real personal or professional problems between him and Davies, as some people thought.

In the meantime, the band's manager Dave Margereson had resigned from the group in July 1983 after a falling out with them, and sound man Russel Pope and several of the crew left as well, after Hodgson did, in September 1983. Rick Davies's wife Sue then assumed managerial duties for the group.

=== 1984–1988: Brother Where You Bound and Free as a Bird ===
The Davies-led Supertramp released Brother Where You Bound in May 1985. The album was a deliberate step away from the pop approach of their last two studio albums, and reached no. 20 in the UK charts and no. 21 in the US charts. It included the Top 30 hit single "Cannonball", along with the title track, a 16-minute exposition on Cold War themes highlighted by guitar solos from Pink Floyd's David Gilmour. A 20-minute film of the title track by Rene Daalder was used to promote the album.

Supertramp mounted a tour in the fall of 1985 through early 1986 that was their first without Hodgson. The lineup included Davies, Thomson, Helliwell, Siebenberg, Scott Page, Marty Walsh (guitar, backing vocals), Carl Verheyen (guitar, percussion, backing vocals) and Mark Hart (vocals, guitar, keyboards). Brad Cole sat in for Hart for several gigs in late October/early November 1985 after the latter was called away due to a family emergency.

1987's Free as a Bird experimented in heavily synthesised music, such as "I'm Beggin' You", which reached number one on the US dance charts. The stylistic change was generally not well-received, however, and the album itself reached only no. 93 in the UK and 101 in the US, breaking a streak of seven consecutive top 100 efforts on the American charts.

In addition to their shift towards less commercially oriented material, the band members decided to drop all of Hodgson's compositions from their setlist in order to further establish an identity separate from him. Audiences were angered by the omissions of these songs, and although Supertramp toured in 1985 using only Davies's compositions, in 1988 the pressure from fans and their first tour of South America drove them to reintroduce a handful of Hodgson-penned hits to their set. The band's 1988 touring lineup was almost the same as it had been in '85/'86, but with Brad Cole returning in place of Scott Page and percussionist Steve Reid instead of guitarist Carl Verheyen.

After 1988's tour, the group fragmented. Davies later explained, "We'd been out there for about 20 years just recording and touring and it seemed time to have a break with no ideas as to if or when we would come back. We decided not to actually say anything, just sort of fade away like an old soldier."

=== 1993: Hodgson and Davies reunion ===
On 14 April 1993 at the Beverly Hills Hilton, for a special dinner honoring Jerry Moss, co-founder of A&M Records, Hodgson, Davies and Helliwell (together with Jeff Daniel) appeared to perform "The Logical Song" and "Goodbye Stranger". After that, Davies and Hodgson began working together again, recording demos of two new songs, "You Win, I Lose" and "And the Light". But disagreements over management prompted them to part ways once again soon after, with both songs eventually appearing, sans Hodgson, on Supertramp's next release in 1997.

=== 1996–2002: Some Things Never Change and Slow Motion ===
In 1996 Davies re-formed Supertramp with Helliwell, Siebenberg and guitarist/keyboardist/vocalist Mark Hart, who was new to the official lineup but had prominently contributed to Free as a Bird and to the group's tours from 1985 to 1988. Their 1985–86 guitarist, Carl Verheyen, returned as well, along with new bassist Cliff Hugo, horn player Lee Thornburg and former America percussionist Tom Walsh (who was replaced for the band's 1997 tour by Bob Siebenberg's son Jesse, who would also go on to contribute guitar, keyboards and vocals), bringing the band up to an eight-man lineup. The result of this reunion was Some Things Never Change, a new studio album released in March 1997 that echoed the earlier Supertramp sound and reached number 74 in the UK.

In the summer of 1997, Supertramp returned to the road, resulting in the live It Was the Best of Times (April 1999).

After a three-year hiatus, Supertramp released in April 2002 a new studio album entitled Slow Motion, followed by a 2002 world tour entitled "One More for the Road Tour".

Supertramp continued to play several Hodgson-penned songs during live shows following their reunion. Hodgson subsequently claimed that when he had left the band back in 1983, he and Davies made a verbal agreement that they would not play those songs. Davies has never publicly alluded to such an agreement, and former member Dougie Thomson (who retired from performing to move into music publishing) commented "Nobody except Rick and Roger were privy to that conversation. Rick and Roger had several dialogues that no one else was privy to. Again, that's hearsay." The publishing company and contract legally recognize which songs each songwriter actually wrote. Hodgson has contractual approval rights over the use of his songs and Davies for his.

=== 2000s–present: Hiatuses and touring ===
After the 2002 "One More for the Road Tour", Supertramp went inactive once again. Another attempt to bring Hodgson back into the band failed in 2005. In 2008, it was announced that Supertramp's music would be featured in the film adaptation of Irvine Welsh's novel Ecstasy: Three Tales of Chemical Romance.

In 2009, Hodgson said he could not envisage a Supertramp reunion ever happening: "We've looked at it and talked it over... I would never say never but Rick [Davies] has pretty much retired right now and I'm in the prime of my life. The reaction I am getting from fans is 'please don't reunite'."

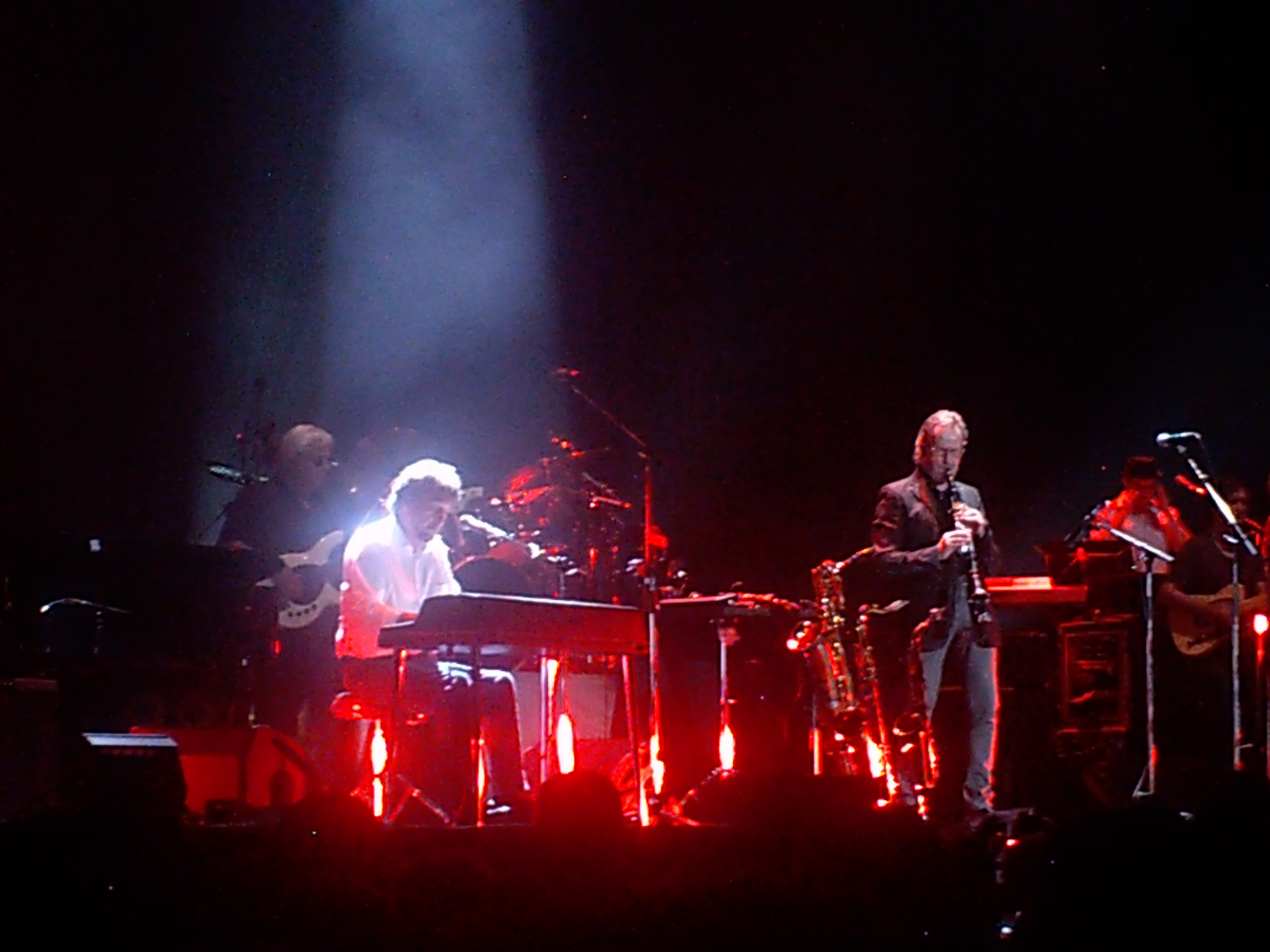
Supertramp 2010. From left: Cliff Hugo, Rick Davies, Bob Siebenberg, John Helliwell, Gabe Dixon and Carl Verheyen

On 21 April 2010, it was announced that Supertramp would perform 35 concerts in late 2010 in Europe. Hodgson concurrently embarked on a worldwide solo tour, and thus was unable to rejoin the band for the 70–10 tour. However, in response to a fan campaign, Hodgson sent a letter to Rick Davies and had his manager send one to Davies's management, offering to join them for select dates during gaps in his tour schedule. Davies's agent notified Hodgson that his offer was declined.

When asked whether Hodgson might appear at any Supertramp concerts, Davies replied, "I know there are some fans out there who would like that to happen. There was a time when I had hoped for that too. But the recent past makes that impossible. In order to play a great show for our fans, you need harmony, both musically and personally. Unfortunately that doesn't exist between us anymore and I would rather not destroy memories of more harmonious times between all of us." Hodgson and Supertramp continued to tour separately in 2011.

The group's lineup for their 2010–11 tours was Davies, Helliwell, Siebenberg, Jesse Siebenberg (now assuming Mark Hart's role on vocals, keyboards and guitar), Cliff Hugo, Carl Verheyen, Lee Thornburg, Gabe Dixon (vocals, keyboards, percussion) and Cassie Miller (backing vocals).

Supertramp played what turned out to be its last concert on 15 November 2012 in Madrid, during a private event at the IFEMA fairgrounds, which coincidentally a few years before had used 'From Now On' in its advertising commercials. The show, that was held in front of several thousand people, lasted about eighty minutes and the set list was a shortened version of the one used on the '70–10' tour. The band was also the same as that of the 2010–11 tour, except for John Helliwell, who was unable to get there due to another professional commitment with Egbert Derix on that same date. Saxophonist Rob Hardt, an American musician who was a friend of Lee Thornburg and used to work with Latin American salsa percussionist and singer Poncho Sánchez, stood in for Helliwell.

From 2012 to 2015, Supertramp went dormant again. Meanwhile, Hodgson toured his "Breakfast in America World Tour" from 2012 onwards. On 25 January 2015 at Cirque Royal in Brussels, Belgium, Hodgson continued his "Breakfast in America World Tour" with a European leg concluding 7 September 2015 at Tempodrom in Berlin, Germany and the North American leg of the tour extending from November in Tarrytown, New York, concluding on 13 December in Halifax, Nova Scotia.

In 2015 Supertramp announced their first tour in more than four years: a 25-date European tour entitled "Supertramp Forever" set to launch on 3 November 2015 in Porto, Portugal. The tour would include a London show on 7 December at The O2 Arena and would end on 11 December 2015 at the Ziggo Dome in Amsterdam, the Netherlands. On 4 August 2015, however, the band announced that the tour was cancelled due to health issues affecting Rick Davies, who had been diagnosed with multiple myeloma and required aggressive treatment to combat the disease.

In August 2017 the group's former sound man Russel Pope died due to stomach cancer.

In late August 2018, Davies gave an interview in which he expressed that, for the most part, he had overcome his health problems and enjoys playing music again, something he could not do in 2016, when he was under medical treatment. Davies can also be seen performing a few tracks in a rehearsal/sound check at a bar with some of Supertramp's current members at his side. He also stated that Supertramp were unlikely to return as a structured band.

In 2018 Hodgson stopped paying Thomson, Helliwell and Siebenberg royalties from Supertramp songs. In 2021 the three sued Hodgson and Davies, for not paying them royalties. Davies settled out of court in 2023. Hodgson initially won a jury verdict in 2024, but in 2025 a federal appeals court reversed and directed that judgment be entered in favor of the three plaintiffs.

Supertramp's former manager Dave Margereson, age 79, died of pancreatic cancer on 22 August 2025.

Davies died from cancer at his home in Long Island, on 6 September 2025, at the age of 81.

== Musical style ==
Supertramp have been described as progressive pop, progressive rock, soft rock, and pop.

== Members ==
Bold denotes members of the classic lineup.

- **Rick Davies** – vocals, keyboards, harmonica, songwriting (1970–1988, 1996–2002, 2010–2012; died 2025)
- **Roger Hodgson** – vocals, keyboards, guitars, bass guitar, songwriting (1970–1983)
- Richard Palmer-James – guitars, vocals, percussion, songwriting (1970)
- Robert Millar – drums, percussion, harmonica (1970–1971; died 2024)
- Dave Winthrop – saxophone, flute, vocals (1970–1973)
- Kevin Currie – drums, percussion (1971–1973)
- Frank Farrell – bass, keyboards, backing vocals (1971–1972; died 1997)
- **Dougie Thomson** – bass (1972–1988)
- **Bob Siebenberg** – drums, percussion (1973–1988, 1996–2002, 2010–2012)
- **John Helliwell** – saxophones, woodwinds, keyboards, backing vocals (1973–1988, 1996–2002, 2010–2011)
- Steve Reid – percussion (1987–1988; died 2025)
- Mark Hart – vocals, keyboards, guitar (1996–2002; touring 1985–1988)
- Carl Verheyen – guitars, percussion, backing vocals (1996–2002, 2010–2012; touring 1985–1986)
- Cliff Hugo – bass (1996–2002, 2010–2012)
- Lee Thornburg – trombone, trumpet, keyboards, backing vocals (1996–2002, 2010–2012)
- Tom Walsh – percussion (1996–1997)
- Jesse Siebenberg – vocals, guitars, percussion (1997–2002, 2010–2012), keyboards (2010–2012)
- Gabe Dixon – keyboards, vocals (2010–2012)
- Cassie Miller – backing vocals (2010–2012)

== Discography ==
- Supertramp (1970)
- Indelibly Stamped (1971)
- Crime of the Century (1974)
- Crisis? What Crisis? (1975)
- Even in the Quietest Moments... (1977)
- Breakfast in America (1979)
- ...Famous Last Words... (1982)
- Brother Where You Bound (1985)
- Free as a Bird (1987)
- Some Things Never Change (1997)
- Slow Motion (2002)

== See also ==
- List of Roger Hodgson concert tours
