= John Helliwell =

English musician (born 1945)

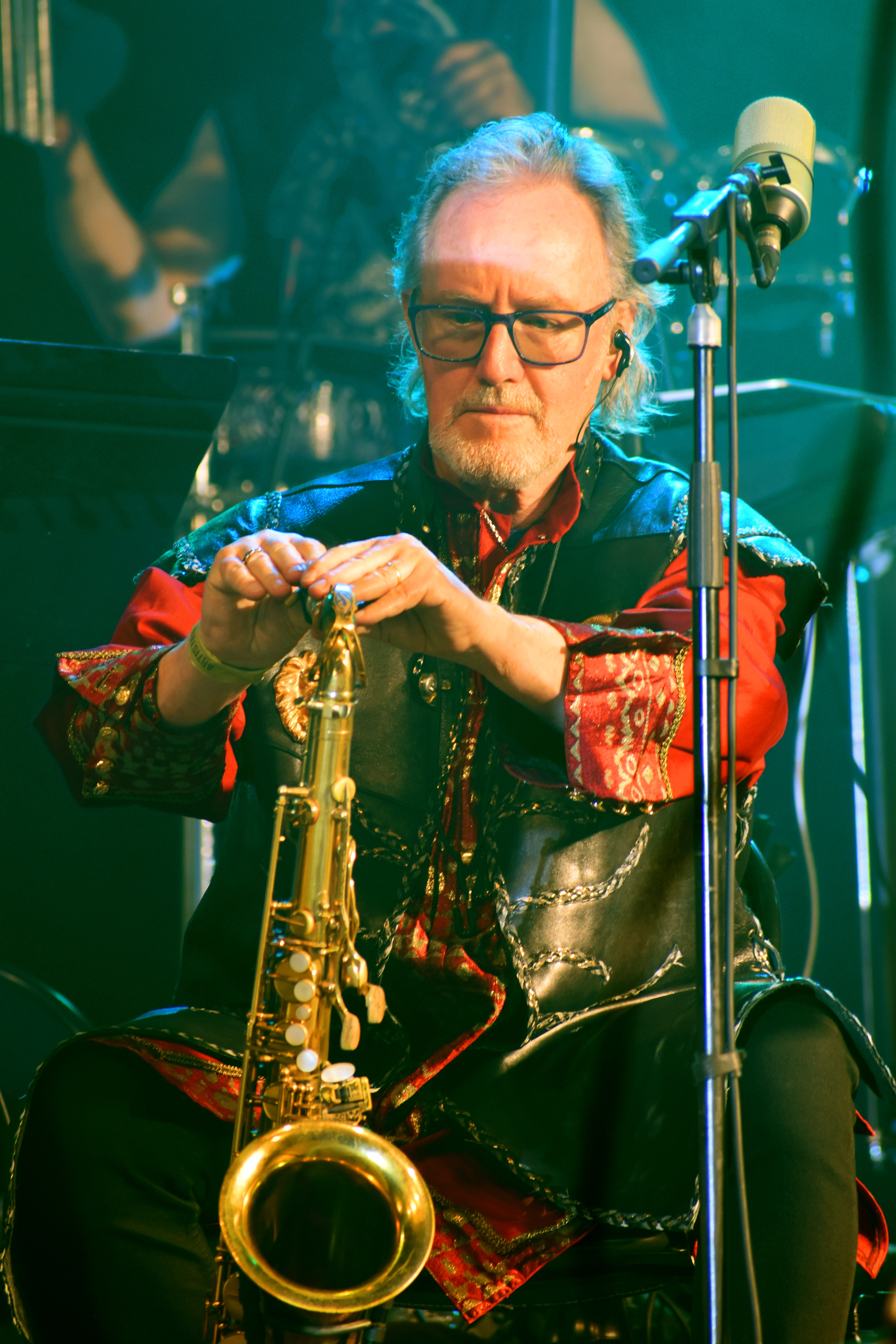
- Helliwell in 2019

Background information
- Born: 15 February 1945 (age 81); Todmorden, West Riding of Yorkshire, England
- Genres: Progressive rock, pop, jazz, blues
- Occupation: Musician
- Instruments: Saxophone; clarinet; vocals; whistling; keyboards
- Website: johnhelliwell.com

John Anthony Helliwell (born 15 February 1945 in Todmorden, West Riding of Yorkshire) is an English musician, best known as the saxophonist for the progressive rock band Supertramp. He also served as an MC during the band's concerts, talking and making jokes to the audience between songs.

Helliwell played with the Alan Bown Set, replacing Dave Green when he joined in January 1966, before joining Supertramp in 1973 along with bassist Dougie Thomson, who convinced Helliwell to make the move. In 2004, Helliwell formed the band Crème Anglaise with Mark Hart, who had joined Supertramp in 1985. This group recorded their debut album Crème Anglaise in 2005.

In 1987 Helliwell played on Pink Floyd's album A Momentary Lapse of Reason; his name was misspelled as "Halliwell". This was after Pink Floyd guitarist David Gilmour had played on Supertramp's album Brother Where You Bound. Helliwell also played on French singer Jean-Jacques Goldman's 1985 album Positif, and clarinet on Sara Hickman's 1990 album Shortstop as well as the saxophone parts on the single version of Thin Lizzy's 'Dancing In The Moonlight'.

In addition to sax and clarinet, Helliwell has provided vocals and keyboard parts to various projects. He is heard whistling on the Supertramp hit single "Goodbye Stranger".

During a professional lull in the 1990s, Helliwell began studying for a music degree at the Royal Northern College of Music in Manchester, but he discontinued his studies to join Supertramp on tour when Some Things Never Change was released. In 2004, he contributed saxophone work on the Simon Apple album River to the Sea.

Helliwell contributed clarinet to the Pineapple Thief's song "Fend For Yourself" from their Your Wilderness album which was released in 2016.

Helliwell fronts the Super Big Tramp Band, which has a jazz big band line-up of trumpets, trombones, saxophones and rhythm section. It plays versions of Supertramp tunes, arranged by members of the band, with no vocals, but with Helliwell as the chief soloist. The band first played in Manchester in June 2013. In 2019 the band played at the Manchester Jazz Festival in May and was scheduled to play in Hull and Hamburg later in the year.

In October 2020, Helliwell released Ever Open Door, a CD album of ballads with Helliwell on saxophone and clarinet, with a string quartet and Hammond organ.
