= Leo Sayer discography =

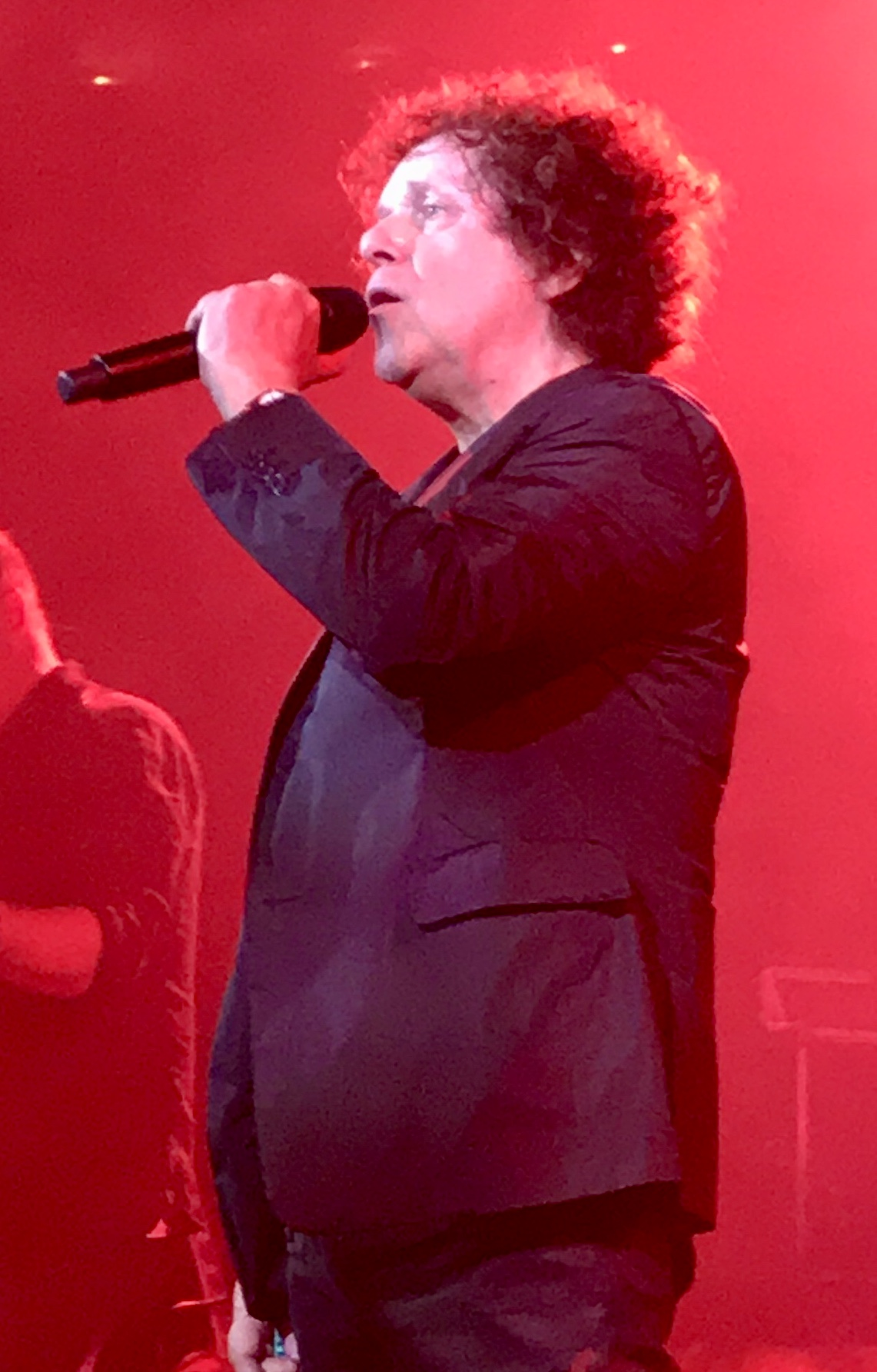
- Sayer in 2019
- Studio albums: 16
- Soundtrack albums: 3
- Live albums: 4
- Compilation albums: 15
- Singles: 64
- Video albums: 3
- Box sets: 5

This article is the discography of singer-songwriter Leo Sayer.

== Albums ==
=== Studio albums ===
Title	Album details	Peak chart positions									Certifications
Title	Album details	UK	AUS	CAN	GER	NL	NOR	NZ	SWE	US	Certifications
Silverbird	Released: November 1973; Label: Chrysalis, Warner Bros.; Formats: LP, MC, 8-track	2	14	—	—	—	—	—	—	209	UK: Silver
Just a Boy	Released: October 1974; Label: Chrysalis, Warner Bros.; Formats: LP, MC, 8-track	4	3	12	—	—	—	35	—	16	UK: Silver
Another Year	Released: 5 September 1975; Label: Chrysalis, Warner Bros.; Formats: LP, MC, 8-track	8	3	—	—	—	—	—	—	125	UK: Silver
Endless Flight	Released: 29 October 1976; Label: Chrysalis, Warner Bros.; Formats: LP, MC, 8-track	4	7	1	25	15	20	4	27	10	UK: Platinum; US: Platinum; CAN: 2× Platinum
Thunder in My Heart	Released: 30 September 1977; Label: Chrysalis, Warner Bros.; Formats: LP, MC, 8-track	8	8	58	—	—	14	11	19	37	UK: Gold
Leo Sayer	Released: 11 August 1978; Label: Chrysalis, Warner Bros.; Formats: LP, MC, 8-track	15	8	99	—	—	12	21	18	101	UK: Gold
Here	Released: 21 September 1979; Label: Chrysalis, Warner Bros.; Formats: LP, MC, 8-track	44	65	—	—	—	17	50	—	—	UK: Gold
Living in a Fantasy	Released: August 1980; Label: Chrysalis, Warner Bros.; Formats: LP, MC, 8-track	15	12	—	—	29	9	—	15	36	UK: Silver
World Radio	Released: April 1982; Label: Chrysalis, Warner Bros.; Formats: LP, MC	30	14	—	—	—	4	35	—	—	
Have You Ever Been in Love	Released: 4 November 1983; Label: Chrysalis, Warner Bros.; Formats: LP, MC	15	20	—	—	—	—	—	—	—	UK: Gold
Cool Touch	Released: 9 July 1990; Label: EMI; Formats: CD, LP, MC	—	—	—	—	—	—	—	—	—	
Voice in My Head	Released: 2005; Label: Revolver; Formats: CD	—	—	—	—	—	—	—	—	—	
Don't Wait Until Tomorrow	Released: June 2008; Label: Universal Music; Formats: CD; Australia-only release	—	59	—	—	—	—	—	—	—	
Restless Years	Released: 23 January 2015; Label: Fanfare, Silverbird; Formats: CD, LP, digital download	—	39	—	—	—	—	—	—	—	
Selfie	Released: 26 April 2019; Label: Edsel; Formats: CD, LP, digital download	—	—	—	—	—	—	—	—	—	
Northern Songs	Released: 28 January 2022; Label: Edsel; Formats: CD, 2×LP, digital download	—	—	—	—	—	—	—	—	—	
1992	Released: 29 November 2024; Label: Demon Records; Formats: CD, LP, digital download	—	—	—	—	—	—	—	—	—	
"—" denotes releases that did not chart or were not released in that territory.

=== Live albums ===
Title	Album details
Live in London	Released: 17 October 2000; Label: Andrew Brel Music, BMG; Formats: CD
The River Sessions	Released: January 2005; Label: River; Formats: CD
Voice in My Head / Live in Melbourne	Released: 2006; Label: Warner Music Australia; Formats: CD; Australia-only release; Special limited edition bonus live CD included with studio album
Live in 1975	Released: September 2009; Label: The Store for Music; Formats: CD

=== Soundtrack albums ===
Title	Album details
All This and World War II	Released: 5 November 1976; Label: Riva, 20th Century; Formats: 2×LP, 2×MC, 8-track; Various artists soundtrack for which Sayer provides vocals on three tracks
The Missing Link	Released: 1980; Label: K-tel, Ariola; Formats: LP; Soundtrack to the film of the same name
Lake Freeze – The Raccoons Songtrack	Released: 1983; Label: Polydor; Formats: LP; Various artists soundtrack taken from two television specials of the Canadian series The Raccoons. Sayer provides vocals on three tracks, taken from The Raccoons on Ice special

=== Compilation albums ===
Title	Album details	Peak chart positions							Certifications
Title	Album details	UK	AUS	FIN	ICE	NOR	NZ	SWE	Certifications
The Very Best of Leo Sayer	Released: 23 March 1979; Label: Chrysalis; Formats: LP, MC	1	1	3	—	14	1	5	UK: Platinum; FIN: Gold
The Show Must Go On	Released: June 1980; Label: Pickwick; Formats: LP, MC	—	—	—	—	—	—	—	
Leo Sayer (Note: Released by Chrysalis in Iceland as Bestu Kveðjur and in South Africa as The Very Best of Leo Sayer.)	Released: 1981; Label: Ellem; Formats: 2×LP	—	—	—	1	—	—	—	
Leo	Released: 1984; Label: Music for Pleasure; Formats: LP, MC	—	—	—	—	—	—	—	
Moonlighting	Released: 1988; Label: Chrysalis; Formats: CD, LP; Australia-only release	—	—	—	—	—	—	—	
The Collection	Released: 1991; Label: Castle Communications; Formats: CD	—	—	—	—	—	—	—	
All the Best	Released: 22 February 1993; Label: Chrysalis; Formats: CD, LP, MC	26	—	—	—	—	—	—	
The Show Must Go On: The Anthology	Released: November 1996; Label: Rhino, East West; Formats: 2×CD; US and Australia-only release	—	—	—	—	—	—	—	
The Definitive Hits Collection	Released: 8 February 1999; Label: PolyGram TV; Formats: CD	35	—	—	—	—	—	—	
The Very Best of Leo Sayer	Released: 15 February 2000; Label: Rhino; Formats: CD; US-only release	—	—	—	—	—	—	—	
The Best of Leo Sayer	Released: 2002; Label: Chrysalis; Formats: CD	—	54	—	—	—	—	—	
Endless Journey – The Essential Leo Sayer	Released: 8 November 2004; Label: DMG TV; Formats: CD	52	—	—	—	—	—	—	
Leo Sayer: At His Very Best	Released: 6 March 2006; Label: Universal Music TV; Formats: CD	30	—	—	—	—	—	—	
The Show Must Go On – The Very Best of Leo Sayer	Released: 14 December 2009; Label: Music Club Deluxe; Formats: 2×CD, digital download	—	—	—	—	—	—	—	
The Greatest Hits	Released: 20 August 2010; Label: Warner Music Australia; Formats: CD, digital download; Australia-only release	—	—	—	—	—	—	—	
The Gold Collection	Released: 12 January 2018; Label: Crimson; Formats: 3×CD, LP, digital download	27	—	—	—	—	—	—	
"—" denotes releases that did not chart or were not released in that territory.

=== Video albums ===
Title	Album details
The Very Best of Leo Sayer	Released: 1988; Label: PolyGram Video; Formats: VHS
All the Best	Released: February 1993; Label: Picture Music International; Formats: VHS
Live at the Basement – One Night in Sydney	Released: 2004; Label: Thames/Thompson & T2 Media; Formats: DVD

== Box sets ==
Title	Album details
Just a Box – The Complete Studio Recordings 1971–2006	Released: 28 October 2013; Label: Edsel; Formats: 14×CD
The Complete UK Singles Collection 1973–1986	Released: 25 March 2016; Label: Edsel; Formats: 29xCDS+CD
The London Years 1973–1975	Released: 28 September 2018; Label: Edsel; Formats: 3×LP; Limited release
The Hollywood Years – The Vinyl LP Collection 1976–1978	Released: 1 March 2019; Label: Edsel; Formats: 3×LP; Limited release
The Fantasy Years – The Vinyl LP Collection 1979–1983	Released: 11 October 2019; Label: Edsel; Formats: 3×LP; Limited release
Leothology	Released: 14 August 2026; Label: Edsel Records/Demon Music; Formats: 18×CD; Limited release

=== Repackaged sets ===
Title	Album details
Silverbird + Just a Boy	Released: 3 August 2009; Label: Edsel; Formats: 2×CD
Another Year + Endless Flight	Released: 7 September 2009; Label: Edsel; Formats: 2×CD
Here + Living in a Fantasy	Released: 7 September 2009; Label: Edsel; Formats: 2×CD
Thunder in My Heart + Leo Sayer	Released: 7 September 2009; Label: Edsel; Formats: 2×CD
World Radio + Have You Ever Been in Love	Released: 7 September 2009; Label: Edsel; Formats: 2×CD

== Singles ==
Title	Year	Peak chart positions										Certifications	Album
Title	Year	UK	AUS	BEL (FL)	CAN	GER	IRE	NL	NZ	SA	US	Certifications	Album
"Living in America" (as part of the group Patches)	1972	—	—	—	—	—	—	—	—	—	—		Non-album single
"Why Is Everybody Going Home"	1973	—	—	—	—	—	—	—	—	—	—		Silverbird
"The Show Must Go On"	1973	2	10	—	—	7	3	—	9	11	—	UK: Gold	Silverbird
"One Man Band"	1974	6	38	—	—	12	5	—	—	15	96		Just a Boy
"Long Tall Glasses (I Can Dance)"	1974	4	7	3	18	27	4	2	—	9	9		Just a Boy
"Train" (Note: Only released as a single in Continental Europe.)	1975	—	—	25	—	—	—	23	—	—	—		Just a Boy
"Moonlighting"	1975	2	13	—	—	—	1	—	14	12	—	UK: Silver	Another Year
"I Will Not Stop Fighting" (Note: "I Will Not Stop Fighting" was only released as a single in the Netherlands and Ireland.)	1975	—	—	—	—	—	—	—	—	—	—		Another Year
"Let It Be"	1975	55 (Note: Chart position is from the official UK "Breakers List".)	—	—	—	—	—	—	—	—	—		All This and World War II
"You Make Me Feel Like Dancing"	1976	2	2	21	1	9	5	11	1	3	1	UK: Silver; US: Gold	Endless Flight
"When I Need You"	1977	1	8	2	1	—	1	2	4	2	1	UK: Gold; US: Gold	Endless Flight
"How Much Love"	1977	10	18	—	4	21	4	—	10	—	17		Endless Flight
"Thunder in My Heart"	1977	22	11	11	35	—	11	12	21	6	38		Thunder in My Heart
"Easy to Love" (Note: "Easy to Love" was not released as a single in the UK, but was in numerous other territories.)	1977	—	—	—	35	—	—	—	19	—	36		Thunder in My Heart
"There Isn't Anything I Wouldn't Do"	1977	55	—	—	—	—	—	—	—	—	—		Thunder in My Heart
"Dancing the Night Away"	1978	—	15	—	—	—	—	—	31	10	—		Leo Sayer
"Stormy Weather" (Note: "Stormy Weather" was only released as a single in Japan and Scandinavia.)	1978	—	—	—	—	—	—	—	—	—	—		Leo Sayer
"I Can't Stop Loving You (Though I Try)"	1978	6	37	—	—	—	—	—	—	18	—	UK: Silver	Leo Sayer
"Raining in My Heart"	1978	21	93	—	—	—	—	—	—	—	47		Leo Sayer
"Don't Look Away" (Note: "Don't Look Away" was only released as a single in the US and Canada.)	1979	—	—	—	—	—	—	—	—	—	—		Leo Sayer
"When the Money Runs Out"	1979	—	90	—	—	—	23	—	—	—	—		Here
"The World Has Changed"	1979	—	—	—	—	—	—	—	—	—	—		Here
"Oh Girl" (Note: Only released as a single in the US.)	1979	—	—	—	—	—	—	—	—	—	—		Here
"More Than I Can Say"	1980	2	1	4	7	8	2	9	5	2	2	UK: Silver; US: Gold	Living in a Fantasy
"Takin' the Brakes Off" (Note: "Takin' the Brakes Off" was only released as a single in Germany and the Netherlands.)	1980	—	—	—	—	—	—	—	—	—	—		The Missing Link
"Once in a While"	1980	—	87	—	—	—	—	—	—	—	—		Living in a Fantasy
"Time Ran Out on You" (Note: Only released as a single in the Netherlands.)	1980	—	—	—	—	—	—	42	—	—	—		Living in a Fantasy
"Where Did We Go Wrong"	1980	—	—	—	—	—	—	—	—	—	—		Living in a Fantasy
"Shake the Hand"	1980	—	—	—	—	—	—	—	—	—	—		The Missing Link
"Bye Bye Now My Sweet Love"	1981	—	50	—	—	—	—	—	—	—	—		Non-album single
"You Win, I Lose" (Note: "You Win, I Lose" was only released as a single in Japan and Southern Africa.)	1981	—	—	—	—	—	—	—	—	11	—		Living in a Fantasy
"Living in a Fantasy"	1981	—	—	—	18	—	—	—	—	—	23		Living in a Fantasy
"Tuxedo Body" (Note: "Tuxedo Body" was only released as a single in Japan.)	1982	—	—	—	—	—	—	—	—	—	—		Non-album single (Note: "Tuxedo Body" was included on the Japanese release of World Radio.)
"Have You Ever Been in Love"	1982	10	4	22	—	—	6	33	19	—	—		World Radio
"Heart (Stop Beating in Time)"	1982	22	71	—	—	—	17	—	—	—	—		World Radio
"Paris Dies in the Morning"	1982	—	—	—	—	—	—	—	—	—	—		World Radio
"Orchard Road"	1983	16	17	8	—	—	8	5	18	9	—		Have You Ever Been in Love
"Till You Come Back to Me"	1983	51	81	—	—	—	—	—	—	—	—		Have You Ever Been in Love
"Sea of Heartbreak"	1984	84	—	—	—	—	—	—	35	—	—		Have You Ever Been in Love
"Unchained Melody"	1985	54	77	16	—	—	—	44	—	—	—		Car Trouble (soundtrack)
"Real Life"	1986	—	—	27	—	—	—	—	—	—	—		Non-album singles (Note: From the unreleased album Real Life.)
"Solo"	1986	—	—	—	—	—	—	—	—	—	—		Non-album singles
"Love Hurts"	1989	—	—	—	—	—	—	—	—	—	—		Wilt (soundtrack)
"Cool Touch"	1990	—	—	—	—	43	—	—	—	—	—		Cool Touch
"Rely on Me"	1990	—	—	—	—	—	—	—	—	—	—		Cool Touch
"Paperback Town" (Note: "Paperback Town" was only released as a single in Australia.)	1990	—	—	—	—	—	—	—	—	—	—		Cool Touch
"The Moth and the Flame (Tu... Sì...)" (Note: "The Moth and the Flame (Tu... Sì...)" was only released as a single in Italy.)	1990	—	—	—	—	—	—	—	—	—	—		Non-album singles (Note: "The Moth and the Flame" was a version of Mango's "Tu... sì" and was performed by Sayer at the 1990 Sanremo Music Festival. "I Will Fight for You" was the official song of the 1991 Deutsche Tourenwagen Masters.)
"I Will Fight for You" (Note: Only released a single in Germany.)	1991	—	—	—	—	—	—	—	—	—	—		Non-album singles
"When I Need You" (reissue)	1993	65	—	—	—	—	—	—	—	—	—		All the Best
"When I Need You '96"	1996	—	—	—	—	—	—	—	—	—	—		Non-album singles
"You Make Me Feel Like Dancing" (The Groove Generation featuring Leo Sayer)	1998	32	—	—	—	—	—	—	—	—	—		Non-album singles
"Viva Las Vegas" (Surf Baby featuring Leo Sayer) (Note: "Viva Las Vegas" was only released as a single in Sweden.)	2000	—	—	—	—	—	—	—	—	—	—		Non-album singles
"Thunder in My Heart Again" (Meck featuring Leo Sayer)	2006	1	16	6	—	46	14	11	—	—	—		Non-album singles
"Restless Years"	2015	—	—	—	—	—	—	—	—	—	—		Restless Years
"How Did We Get So Old?"	2015	—	—	—	—	—	—	—	—	—	—		Restless Years
"Selfie"	2019	—	—	—	—	—	—	—	—	—	—		Selfie
"Don't Leave Me"	2019	—	—	—	—	—	—	—	—	—	—		Selfie
"Soul Mining"	2019	—	—	—	—	—	—	—	—	—	—		Selfie
"My City in Lockdown"	2020	—	—	—	—	—	—	—	—	—	—		Non-album singles
"How Did We Get Here?"	2020	—	—	—	—	—	—	—	—	—	—		Non-album singles
"Tradewinds" (with Friends of Al Hodge)	2021	—	—	—	—	—	—	—	—	—	—		Non-album singles
"Strawberry Fields Forever"	2021	—	—	—	—	—	—	—	—	—	—		Northern Songs
"Eleanor Rigby"	2021	—	—	—	—	—	—	—	—	—	—		Northern Songs
"Girl"	2021	—	—	—	—	—	—	—	—	—	—		Northern Songs
"—" denotes releases that did not chart or were not released in that territory.
