= All the Best (Leo Sayer album) =

Compilation album by Leo Sayer
- Released: 22 February 1993
- Genre: Soft rock; disco
- Length: 62:57
- Label: Chrysalis – CDCHR 1980
- Producer: Richard Perry; Adam Faith; David Courtney; Alan Tarney; Arif Mardin

Leo Sayer chronology
Cool Touch (1990)	All the Best (1993)	20 Great Love Songs (1996)

Professional ratings
Review scores
Source	Rating
AllMusic	4/5 stars

All the Best is a greatest hits album by the English singer-songwriter Leo Sayer, released in 1993. The collection reached number 26 in the UK Albums Chart, marking Sayer's return to that chart after almost a decade's absence and becoming his twelfth UK Albums Chart entry.

According to AllMusic, All the Best "lives up to its title, offering 17 of Leo Sayer's most popular pop efforts, including each of his Top 40 singles".

As well as his fourteen UK top 40 singles, the album adds the US Billboard top 40 hit "Living in a Fantasy", and Sayer's version of the hit he wrote for Roger Daltrey, "Giving It All Away". The US version of the album also includes the US top 40 hit "Easy to Love".

== Track listing ==
European/Australian/Japanese version

No.	Title	Writer(s)	Length
1.	"When I Need You"	Albert Hammond; Carole Bayer Sager	4:07
2.	"The Show Must Go On"	Leo Sayer; David Courtney	2:48
3.	"One Man Band"	Sayer; Courtney	3:34
4.	"Long Tall Glasses"	Sayer; Courtney	3:01
5.	"Moonlighting"	Sayer; Frank Farrell	4:07
6.	"You Make Me Feel Like Dancing"	Sayer; Vini Poncia	3:36
7.	"How Much Love"	Sayer; Barry Mann	3:31
8.	"Thunder in My Heart"	Sayer; Tom Snow	3:34
9.	"I Can't Stop Loving You (Though I Try)"	Billy Nicholls	3:30
10.	"Raining in My Heart"	Felice Bryant; Boudleaux Bryant	3:10
11.	"More Than I Can Say"	Sonny Curtis; Jerry Allison	3:37
12.	"Have You Ever Been in Love"	Andy Hill; Peter Sinfield	3:34
13.	"Heart (Stop Beating in Time)"	Barry Gibb; Robin Gibb; Maurice Gibb	3:57
14.	"Orchard Road"	Sayer; Alan Tarney	4:27
15.	"Living in a Fantasy"	Sayer; Tarney	4:25
16.	"Giving It All Away"	Sayer; Courtney	3:52

US version

No.	Title	Writer(s)	Length
1.	"The Show Must Go On"	Sayer; Courtney	2:49
2.	"Giving It All Away"	Sayer; Courtney	3:50
3.	"One Man Band"	Sayer; Courtney	3:36
4.	"Long Tall Glasses (I Can Dance)"	Sayer; Courtney	3:02
5.	"Moonlighting"	Sayer; Farrell	4:08
6.	"You Make Me Feel Like Dancing"	Sayer; Poncia	3:38
7.	"When I Need You"	Hammond; Bayer Sager	4:09
8.	"How Much Love"	Sayer; Mann	3:30
9.	"Thunder in My Heart"	Sayer; Snow	3:35
10.	"Easy to Love"	Sayer; Hammond	3:44
11.	"I Can't Stop Loving You (Though I Try)"	Nicholls	3:31
12.	"Raining in My Heart"	F. Bryant; B. Bryant	3:11
13.	"More Than I Can Say"	Curtis; Allison	3:38
14.	"Living in a Fantasy"	Sayer; Tarney	4:24
15.	"Have You Ever Been in Love"	Hill; Sinfield	3:46
16.	"Heart (Stop Beating in Time)"	B. Gibb; R. Gibb; M. Gibb	3:59
17.	"Orchard Road"	Sayer; Tarney	4:27

== Charts ==
Chart (1993)	Peak position
UK Albums Chart	26
