= The Very Best of Leo Sayer =

Greatest hits album by Leo Sayer
- Released: 23 March 1979
- Recorded: Various years
- Genres: Soft rock; disco
- Label: Chrysalis – CDL 1222
- Producer: Various

Leo Sayer chronology
Leo Sayer (1978)	The Very Best of Leo Sayer (1979)	Here (1979)

The Very Best of Leo Sayer was a greatest hits compilation album released in May 1979. His seventh album, it was in the number one spot in the UK Albums Chart for three weeks, and in Australia for one week. It is his only chart-topper in the UK Albums Chart. It was never released in the United States.

The album is split with the first side featuring his more recent work with producer Richard Perry and side two featuring his earlier work produced by Adam Faith with David Courtney or Russ Ballard.

Side one has seven of the eight UK singles released from 1976–8 (leaving out the non-charting "There Isn't Anything" and also the US only single "Easy to Love"). Side two features five of the six singles released from 1973–5 (with none-charting debut single "Why Is Everybody Going Home" not included). It also includes two album tracks from 1974's Just a Boy LP; "Train" (which was released as a single in 1979 to promote this album in Australia) and his version of the hit he wrote for Roger Daltrey, "Giving It All Away".

== Track listing ==
Side 1

1. "When I Need You"
2. "You Make Me Feel Like Dancing"
3. "Raining in My Heart"
4. "How Much Love"
5. "Dancing the Night Away"
6. "Thunder in My Heart"
7. "I Can't Stop Loving You (Though I Try)"

Side 2

1. "One Man Band"
2. "Giving It All Away"
3. "Train"
4. "Let It Be"
5. "Long Tall Glasses (I Can Dance)"
6. "Moonlighting"
7. "The Show Must Go On"

== Charts ==
=== Weekly charts ===
Chart (1979–80)	Peak position
Australian Albums (Kent Music Report)	1
New Zealand Albums (RMNZ)	1
Norwegian Albums (VG-lista)	14
Swedish Albums (Sverigetopplistan)	5
UK Albums (Official Charts)	1

=== Monthly charts ===
Monthly chart performance for The Very Best of Leo Sayer
Chart (1980)	Peak position
Soviet Albums (Moskovskij Komsomolets)	5

=== Year-end charts ===
Chart (1979)	Position
Australian Albums (Kent Music Report)	8
New Zealand Albums (RMNZ)	11

== Certifications ==
Region	Certification	Certified units/sales
Finland (Musiikkituottajat)	Gold	25,000
United Kingdom (BPI)	Gold	100,000^{^}
^{^} Shipments figures based on certification alone.
