= Thinking (song) =

Single by Roger Daltrey

from the album Daltrey
- Released: September 1973
- Genre: Rock; soft rock
- Length: 4:27
- Label: MCA (US); Track (UK)
- Songwriters: David Courtney; Leo Sayer
- Producers: David Courtney; Adam Faith

Roger Daltrey singles chronology
"Giving It All Away" (1973)	"Thinking" (1973)	"It's a Hard Life" (1973)

Audio
- "Thinking" on YouTube

"Thinking" is a song by the English rock singer Roger Daltrey, that was written by David Courtney and Leo Sayer. The song was originally released on Daltrey's debut solo studio album, Daltrey and released as a single in September 1973.

Cashbox said it was as powerful as "Giving It All Away."

The non-album B-side, "There Is Love", featured Jimmy Page of Led Zeppelin on guitar. The song was left off the album because "It didn't fit in with the final context of the album", explained Daltrey "so we had to leave it out". The song was included on the Sanctuary Records remaster.
