= World Radio =

Studio album by Leo Sayer
- Released: May 14, 1982
- Recorded: 1981
- Studio: Sunset Sound, Los Angeles; Atlantic Studios, New York City
- Genre: Soft rock
- Length: 41:26
- Label: Chrysalis, Warner Bros.
- Producer: Arif Mardin

Leo Sayer chronology
Living in a Fantasy (1980)	World Radio (1982)	Have You Ever Been in Love (1983)

Professional ratings
Review scores
Source	Rating
AllMusic	2/5 stars

World Radio is the ninth album by the English singer-songwriter, Leo Sayer, and was released in May 1982. It was (including the greatest hits compilation album, The Very Best of Leo Sayer) his tenth successive Top 50 chart entry in the UK Albums Chart, in a period of a little over eight years.

== Track listing ==
=== Side one ===
1. "Heart (Stop Beating in Time)" (Barry, Robin and Maurice Gibb) – 4:35
2. "Paris Dies in the Morning" (Leo Sayer, Andrew McCrorie-Shand) – 3:53
3. "Have You Ever Been in Love" (Andy Hill, Peter Sinfield, John Danter) – 3:45
4. "Rumours" (Alan Mark, Ray Smith) – 3:55
5. "Heroes" (Sayer, David Courtney) – 4:21

=== Side two ===
1. "'Til You Let Your Heart Win" (Allee Willis, Lauren Wood) – 4:41
2. "End of the Game" (Sayer, Courtney) – 3:28
3. "Wondering Where the Lions Are" (Bruce Cockburn) – 3:28
4. "We've Got Ourselves in Love" (Sayer, Courtney) – 3:54
5. "World Radio" (Sayer, Courtney) – 5:26

== Personnel ==
=== Musicians ===
- Leo Sayer – guitar, harmonica, vocals
- Robin Beck – background vocals
- Harry Bluestone – concertmaster
- Michael Boddicker – synthesizer
- Robbie Buchanan – piano
- Bob Christianson – synthesizer
- Sammy Figueroa – percussion
- Steve George – background vocals
- Lani Groves – background vocals
- Ralph Hammer – guitar
- David Hungate – bass guitar
- Steve Khan – guitar
- Abraham Laboriel – bass guitar
- Will Lee – bass guitar
- Marcy Levy – background vocals
- Steve Lukather – guitar
- Gene Orloff – concertmaster
- Richard Page – background vocals
- Dean Parks – guitar
- Jeff Porcaro – drums
- James Stroud – Linn programming, Fairlight, Synclavier, synth programming
- David Sanborn – alto saxophone

=== Production ===
- Record producer: Arif Mardin
- Assistant engineers: Terry Christian, Lewis Hahn, Jay Messina, Michael O'Reilly, Gray Russell
- Mixing: Jerry Lee Smith
- Mastering: George Marino

== Charts ==
Chart (1982)	Peak Position
Australia (Kent Music Report)	14
UK Albums Chart	30
