= Orchard Road (song) =

1983 single by Leo Sayer

Single by Leo Sayer

from the album Have You Ever Been in Love
- B-side: "Gone Solo"
- Released: February 1983
- Genre: Soft rock; synth-pop
- Length: 4:29
- Label: Chrysalis
- Songwriters: Leo Sayer; Alan Tarney
- Producer: Alan Tarney

Leo Sayer singles chronology
"Paris Dies in the Morning" (1982)	"Orchard Road" (1983)	"Till You Come Back to Me" (1983)

"Orchard Road" is a song by Leo Sayer released in February 1983 as the second single from his tenth album Have You Ever Been in Love. It peaked at number 16 on the UK Singles Chart, becoming his final top-twenty hit until his 2006 feature on "Thunder in My Heart Again".

== Release and composition ==
The music for "Orchard Road" was composed by Alan Tarney, with the lyrics by Sayer. Tarney, who also produced the song, had previously worked with Sayer producing his 1980 album Living in a Fantasy, which included the top-ten hit "More Than I Can Say".

The song was originally recorded in one take as a demo, with Sayer "[making] up the words as we recorded it, with Alan Tarney playing to my hand signals". However, the demo became the final version with the slightly unpolished guide vocal kept because of how it felt.

== Meaning of the song ==
According to Sayer, the lyrics to the song are based on an all-night phone conversation out in a public telephone booth he had with his then-wife, Janice, pleading for her return from her flat and forgiveness after a lapse of judgement in their 7-year marital life. In reality, his wife had moved to Churchfield Road, Acton in Greater London.

The name "Churchfield Road" "didn't sing very well", so it was changed to "Orchard Road", the name coming from the shopping area in Singapore as Sayer had recently performed there.

== Track listing ==
7": Chrysalis / CHS 2677 (UK)

1. "Orchard Road" – 4:29
2. "Gone Solo" – 3:58

== Personnel ==
- Leo Sayer – lead vocals
- Alan Tarney – backing vocals, Fairlight synthesiser, guitar, bass guitar, Linn Drum machine
- Trevor Spencer – drums

== Charts ==
=== Weekly charts ===
Weekly chart performance for "Orchard Road"
Chart (1983)	Peak position
Australia (Kent Music Report)	17
Belgium (Ultratop 50 Flanders)	8
Ireland (IRMA)	8
Netherlands (Dutch Top 40)	7
Netherlands (Single Top 100)	5
New Zealand (Recorded Music NZ)	18
South Africa (Springbok Radio)	9
UK Singles (Official Charts)	16

=== Year-end charts ===
Year-end chart performance for "Orchard Road"
Chart (1983)	Position
Australia (Kent Music Report)	95
Belgium (Ultratop Flanders)	81
Netherlands (Dutch Top 40)	68
Netherlands (Single Top 100)	71
