= Here (Leo Sayer album) =

Studio album by Leo Sayer
- Released: 21 September 1979
- Recorded: 1979
- Studio: Sunset Sound Studios, Los Angeles and Davlen Sound Studios, Hollywood
- Genre: Disco, soft rock
- Length: 41:25
- Label: Chrysalis (UK); Warner Bros. (US)
- Producer: David Courtney

Leo Sayer chronology
The Very Best of Leo Sayer (1979)	Here (1979)	Living in a Fantasy (1980)

Professional ratings
Review scores
Source	Rating
AllMusic	3/5 stars
Music Week	4/4 stars

Here is the seventh original album by the English singer-songwriter, Leo Sayer, and was released in 1979. Less commercially successful than previous collections, but AllMusic noted that it "remains a quality product that has been largely forgotten over the years".

== Track listing ==
=== Side one ===
1. "The World Has Changed" (Leo Sayer, Billy Livsey, Sergio Cuevas) – 3:54
2. "When the Money Runs Out" (Sayer, Ray Parker Jr.) – 3:39
3. "The End" (Sayer, David Courtney) – 3:52
4. "Lost Control" (Al Kooper) – 4:30
5. "An Englishman in the U.S.A." (Sayer, Les Davidson) – 4:40

=== Side two ===
1. "Who Will the Next Fool Be" (Sayer, David Courtney) – 4:15
2. "Work" (Sayer, Tom Snow, Johnny Vastano) – 3:31
3. "Oh Girl" (Eugene Record) – 3:47
4. "Ghosts" (Sayer, Frank Farrell, Les Nicol) – 4:29
5. "Takin' the Easy Way Out" (Sayer, David Courtney) – 4:48

== Personnel ==
- Leo Sayer – guitar, harmonica, vocals
- John Barnes – keyboards
- Jeff Baxter, Steve Cropper, Mark Doyle, Mitch Holder, Steve Lukather, Fred Tackett – guitar
- Michael Boddicker – synthesizer
- Arnell Carmichael – vocals, background vocals
- David Courtney – piano, tambourine
- Chris Desmond – finger snaps
- Donald Dunn, Bob Glaub, Chuck Rainey – bass guitar
- Paulinho Da Costa, Victor Feldman, Bobbye Hall – percussion
- Ed Greene, Rick Shlosser – drums
- Jerry Jumonville – saxophone
- Al Kooper – organ, synthesizer, keyboards, performer
- Billy Livsey – piano, keyboards, Wurlitzer
- David Luell – saxophone, tenor saxophone
- Steve Madaio – trumpet, flugelhorn, horn
- Bill Payne – organ, synthesizer, keyboards
- Eugene Record – performer
- Tom Snow – piano
- James Stroud – Fairlight CMI programming, synthesizers, drums

== Charts ==
Chart (1979/80)	Peak Position
Australia (Kent Music Report)	65
UK Albums Chart	44
