= Es Fácil Amar =

Studio album by Lani Hall
- Released: 1985
- Recorded: Studio B, A&M Records, Hollywood, CA
- Genre: Pop music
- Language: Spanish
- Label: A&M Records
- Producer: Albert Hammond

Lani Hall chronology
Lani Hall (1984)	Es Fácil Amar (1985)	Classics, Vol. 19 (1987)

Es Fácil Amar (It's Easy to Love) is a studio album recorded by American singer Lani Hall. It was produced by Albert Hammond, mixed by Bill Bottrell, mastered by Arnie Acosta, and released in 1985. The album won Hall a Grammy Award for Best Latin Pop Performance in 1986.

After almost two decades of being out of print, the album was made available again through Herb Alpert's official website as a digital download in 2010. Alpert also provided a trumpet solo for the album's title track.

Both the album's title track and the song "Si me Amaras" were previously recorded by English singer Leo Sayer as "Easy to Love" and "When I Need You," respectively. Both songs were written by songwriter/producer Albert Hammond.

Es Fácil Amar would be Hall's final Spanish album. In interviews, Hall has said that even though she enjoyed making her Spanish albums, she has no plans to record in Spanish again.

== Track listing ==
No.	Title	Writer(s)	Length
1.	"Es Fácil Amar"	Albert Hammond, Leo Sayer, O. Gómez	3:49
2.	"De Repente el Amor" (featuring Roberto Carlos)	Hammond, Anahi	3:59
3.	"Fantasma"	Hammond, O. Gómez	4:16
4.	"Amor sin Mañana"	Hammond, Anahi, K. C. Porter	3:48
5.	"Si Me Amaras"	Hammond, Carole Bayer Sager, O. Gómez	3:48
6.	"Un Amor Así" (featuring José Feliciano)	Hammond, Sergio Fachelli	3:15
7.	"Ramito de Violetas"	E. Sobredo	4:35
8.	"Dama Dama"	E. Sobredo	3:17
9.	"Páginas Prohibidas"	Hammond, Anahi, Porter	3:45
10.	"Pequeño Ser"	Joaquín Montoya	3:26
