= Testify (Phil Collins album) =

Studio album by Phil Collins
- Released: 11 November 2002
- Recorded: 2000–2002 (Switzerland and United States)
- Genre: Pop rock
- Length: 57:16
- Label: Face Value
- Producers: Phil Collins; Rob Cavallo

Phil Collins chronology
Tarzan: An Original Walt Disney Records Soundtrack (1999)	Testify (2002)	Brother Bear: An Original Walt Disney Records Soundtrack (2003)

Singles from Testify
- 1. "Can't Stop Loving You" Released: 28 October 2002; 2. "The Least You Can Do" Released: 14 February 2003; 3. "Wake Up Call" Released: 24 March 2003 (Note: UK Double A-side with "The Least You Can Do")

Testify is the seventh studio album by the English musician Phil Collins, released on 11 November 2002. The album debuted at No. 30 on the US Billboard 200, which was also the album's peak position. It was the second Phil Collins studio album where no track peaked within the American top 40 singles chart. It was also his lowest charting album in the UK, becoming his only solo effort not to reach the top 5. However, the album achieved success in some countries of Continental Europe. It is his second album not to be co-produced by Hugh Padgham, who co-produced Collins' most successful albums.

Despite the shortage of success the album achieved, his subsequent First Final Farewell Tour proved to be very popular.

The album was reissued as a deluxe edition on CD, vinyl and digital on 15 April 2016, including a new second disc with bonus tracks.

== Production ==
Testify was crafted over a two-year period at Collins' home in Switzerland and was recorded in France and Los Angeles. Most of the album's twelve tracks are derived from demos Collins made in his bedroom studio and finished off with the help of producers Rob Cavallo and James Sanger, engineer Allen Sides, guitarist Tim Pierce, and bassist Paul Bushnell. Collins worked extensively with computers during production, work that can be seen throughout the album. After Collins made Dance into the Light without any drum machine, he returned to the device for Testify.

The album begins with an up-tempo "Wake Up Call". It was based on a 16-bar doodle Collins wrote, and only began to formalise when he brought it into studio. The title track, the longest and most complex sounding song on the album, is according to Collins "one of the most direct and most personal love songs I have ever written". Another up-tempo song, "Don't Get Me Started" follows a tradition of critical statements about politics and society Collins began with "That's Just the Way It Is", "Another Day in Paradise", and "Both Sides of the Story" in his previous albums and songs such as "Tell Me Why" with Genesis.

The soulful "It's Not Too Late" refers to lost faith in dreams – "It's never too late to make your dreams come true. We all should try it". "Driving Me Crazy" is another upbeat track. Collins said the song is about the narrow path between love and dangerous obsession.

Songs such as the aforementioned "Testify" and "This Love This Heart" were inspired by Collins' then-wife, Orianne, while their first child, Nicholas, was the main inspiration for tracks "Come with Me" and "Swing Low", and "You Touch My Heart". "Come with Me" was originally a lullaby Collins sang to his daughter Lily when she was a baby when on tour in 1990, Seriously Live! and the lyrics were developed when Nicholas was born.

Collins collaborated with his longtime associate Daryl Stuermer for "The Least You Can Do", Stuermer providing the music and lead guitar and Collins the lyrics and arrangement. Stuermer also plays guitar on the next track, "Can't Stop Loving You", a cover of Leo Sayer's 1978 country hit. Collins heard the song on the radio and brought a modern feel to the country song. "I heard Leo Sayer's version of 'Can’t Stop Loving You' on vacation and I was impressed by the fantastic melody. I have attempted to breathe new life into this song and change its feel." It was the first single off the album, hitting No. 1 in the Adult Contemporary Charts. The album ends with "Thru My Eyes" and "You Touch My Heart", another song inspired by his son. ("Thru My Eyes" is not to be confused with "Look Through My Eyes", a song recorded by Collins for the Brother Bear soundtrack in 2003).

== Critical reception ==
Professional ratings
Aggregate scores
Source	Rating
Metacritic	34/100
Review scores
Source	Rating
AllMusic	3/5 stars
Blender	2/5 stars
E!	C
Mojo	1/5 stars
New York Post	2.5/4 stars
Q	1/5 stars
Rolling Stone	3/5 stars
Uncut	2/10
USA Today	3/4 stars

The album received generally mixed to negative reviews from critics. At Metacritic, which assigns a normalised rating out of 100 to reviews from mainstream critics, the album has received an average score of 34, based on 7 reviews, making it the worst-reviewed album of 2002. New York Post critic Dan Aquilante praised Testify as one of Collins' best efforts since 1993's Both Sides. He highlighted the title track for its "believable lyrics" and Collins' abilities as a ballad writer, while calling "Driving Me Crazy" a near-hit. However, he noted that the album lacked a clear-cut hit single and contained "a few clinkers." Rolling Stone described the album as a collection of "laid-back, better-than-average adult-contempo fare," highlighting its "subtle, atmospheric production" as an improvement over the slickness of Collins' 1980s work. Billboard praised Testify for its "well-crafted, pop/rock tunes" and "warm familiarity," noting that Collins avoids trend-chasing in favor of his established style. The magazine highlighted the album's exploration of family life and aging, while calling "Can't Stop Loving You" a "sticky-sweet single."

Other critics were less favorable. AllMusic critic Stephen Thomas Erlewine described the album as a restrained adult contemporary album that felt "stiff, sequenced, and safe." He noted that Collins had abandoned some of his earlier experimentation and trademark drums in favor of a mellow sound that "relies on mood, not melody." While he found the album "pleasurable enough as background music," he ultimately considered it "a little listless." E! gave Testify a grade of C, criticizing its reliance on "synthesized rhythms and paper-thin arrangements" rather than the "whopping melodies" of Collins' earlier hits. It ultimately described the album as a "largely boring affair" and jokingly suggested a Genesis reunion. PopMatters critic Evan Sawdey criticized Testify as "deliberate nostalgia-driven pablum," arguing that it lacked cultural relevance and was "more of a curiosity than an album proper." He praised "Swing Low" for introducing hip-hop-influenced elements to Collins' sound, but concluded that even devoted fans would struggle to argue for the album's merits. Blender similarly found "little... to compare with either the work of his Genesis heyday or his still heartbreaking 1981 solo debut."

== Commercial performance ==
Testify achieved moderate commercial success internationally, with its strongest performances in Continental Europe. In the United States, it peaked at number 30 on the US Billboard 200, the lowest peak among Collins' seven solo studio albums at the time. In the United Kingdom, it reached number 15, becoming his only solo album not to enter the top five on the UK Albums Chart. The album performed considerably better in several European markets, reaching the top five in Austria, Belgium, Germany, the Netherlands, Sweden, and Switzerland. In France, it peaked at number two for three weeks in early 2003 and became Collins' best-selling album there since ...But Seriously. Elsewhere, it peaked at number 14 in Norway, number 16 in Italy, and number 10 in Spain. In Australia, the album reached number 96 on the ARIA Albums Chart. Testify was certified platinum or higher in several European markets, including double platinum in France, triple gold in Germany, and platinum in the Netherlands, Switzerland, and across Europe. It was also certified gold in Austria, Belgium, Spain, Sweden, and the United Kingdom.

The lead single from the album, "Can't Stop Loving You", had success on the Adult Contemporary charts and minor airplay overall. The single peaked at No. 76 on the Billboard charts while hitting No. 1 on the Adult Contemporary charts. Other singles, "Wake Up Call", "Come with Me" and "The Least You Can Do" also enjoyed their most success on the Adult Contemporary chart. Collins said at the time that this was to be his last studio album, but has since recorded a new album entitled Going Back, a collection of covers of Motown and other soul songs, which was released on 13 September 2010. The end of his 2011 hiatus in 2015 made another album seem possible, but in 2025 Collins said he was "not hungry" enough to make more music due to his ongoing health issues.

== Track listing ==
All tracks are written by Phil Collins, except where noted.

No.	Title	Writer(s)	Length
1.	"Wake Up Call"		5:15
2.	"Come with Me"		4:34
3.	"Testify"		6:31
4.	"Don't Get Me Started"		4:41
5.	"Swing Low"		5:08
6.	"It's Not Too Late"		3:59
7.	"This Love This Heart"		4:04
8.	"Driving Me Crazy"		4:37
9.	"The Least You Can Do"	Collins; Daryl Stuermer	4:21
10.	"Can't Stop Loving You"	Billy Nicholls	4:17
11.	"Thru My Eyes"		5:07
12.	"You Touch My Heart"		4:42

Japanese and Australian editions
No.	Title	Length
13.	"High Flying Angel"	4:44

Additional Testimony bonus disc (Disc two of 2016 deluxe edition)
No.	Title	Writer(s)	Length
1.	"High Flying Angel" (B-side)		4:43
2.	"Crystal Clear" (B-side)		3:05
3.	"Hey Now Sunshine" (B-side)		5:02
4.	"TV Story" (B-side)		4:05
5.	"True Colors" (live rehearsal 2004)		5:31
6.	"Come with Me" (live 2004)		5:13
7.	"It's Not Too Late" (live 2004)		4:03
8.	"Can't Stop Loving You" (live 2004)	Nicholls	4:33
9.	"It's Only Loving" (demo)		5:22
10.	"Tearing and Breaking (Re-recorded for Love Songs in 2004)" (demo)		5:43

== B-sides ==
- "Hey Now Sunshine"
- "Tears of a Clown" (Re-recorded for Going Back in 2010)

== Personnel ==
=== Musicians ===
- Phil Collins – vocals, all instruments except where noted
- James Sangar – additional programming (1–5, 8, 11)
- Jamie Muhoberac – keyboards (9, 10)
- Tim Pierce – guitars (1–11), nylon guitar (12)
- Daryl Stuermer – guitar (9, 10)
- Paul Bushnell – bass (3–10)
- Eric Rigler – Uilleann pipes (9)

=== Production ===
- Rob Cavallo – producer
- Allen Sides – engineer, mixing (1–9, 11, 12)
- René Weis – assistant engineer
- Doug McKean – Pro Tools engineer and editing
- Tom Lord-Alge – mixing (10)
- Bernie Grundman – mastering at Bernie Grundman Mastering (Hollywood, California, USA)
- Lorenzo Aguis – photography
- Norman Watson – photography
- M4 Design – artwork

== Charts ==
=== Weekly charts ===
Weekly chart performance for Testify
Chart (2002–2003)	Peak position
Australian Albums (ARIA)	96
Austrian Albums (Ö3 Austria)	5
Belgian Albums (Ultratop Flanders)	11
Belgian Albums (Ultratop Wallonia)	3
Danish Albums (Hitlisten)	31
Dutch Albums (Album Top 100)	2
European Albums (Music & Media)	2
Finnish Albums (Suomen virallinen lista)	30
French Albums (SNEP)	2
German Albums (Offizielle Top 100)	3
Hungarian Albums (MAHASZ)	27
Irish Albums (IRMA)	30
Italian Albums (FIMI)	16
Japanese Albums (Oricon)	63
Norwegian Albums (VG-lista)	14
Polish Albums (ZPAV)	12
Scottish Albums (Official Charts)	24
Spanish Albums (AFYVE)	10
Swedish Albums (Sverigetopplistan)	4
Swiss Albums (Schweizer Hitparade)	2
UK Albums (Official Charts)	15
US Billboard 200	30

=== Year-end charts ===
2002 year-end chart performance for Testify
Chart (2002)	Peak position
Belgian Albums (Ultratop Wallonia)	69
Canadian Albums (Nielsen Soundscan)	138
Dutch Albums (Album Top 100)	32
French Albums (SNEP)	28
German Albums ( Offizielle Top 100)	57
Swedish Albums (Sverigetopplistan)	38
Swiss Albums (Schweizer Hitparade)	50
UK Albums (OCC)	119
Worldwide Albums (IFPI)	45

2003 year-end chart performance for Testify
Chart (2003)	Peak position
Belgian Albums (Ultratop Wallonia)	29
Dutch Albums (Album Top 100)	9
French Albums (SNEP)	18
German Albums ( Offizielle Top 100)	38
Swedish Albums (Sverigetopplistan)	97
Swiss Albums (Schweizer Hitparade)	75

== Certifications ==
Region	Certification	Certified units/sales
Austria (IFPI Austria)	Gold	15,000^{*}
Belgium (BRMA)	Gold	25,000^{*}
France (SNEP)	2× Platinum	600,000^{*}
Germany (BVMI)	3× Gold	450,000^{^}
Netherlands (NVPI)	Platinum	80,000^{^}
Spain (Promusicae)	Gold	50,000^{^}
Sweden (GLF)	Gold	30,000^{^}
Switzerland (IFPI Switzerland)	Platinum	40,000^{^}
United Kingdom (BPI)	Gold	100,000^{^}
Summaries
Europe (IFPI)	Platinum	1,000,000^{*}
^{*} Sales figures based on certification alone.^{^} Shipments figures based on certification alone.
