= Have You Ever Been in Love (album) =

Studio album by Leo Sayer
- Released: 4 November 1983
- Genre: Electronic; funk; soul; pop rock; soft rock
- Length: 56:09
- Label: Chrysalis (UK); Warner Bros. (U.S.)
- Producer: Arif Mardin; Alan Tarney; Christopher Neil

Leo Sayer chronology
World Radio (1982)	Have You Ever Been in Love (1983)	Cool Touch (1990)

Have You Ever Been in Love is the tenth studio album by recording artist Leo Sayer. It was originally released in November 1983 by Chrysalis (UK), and Warner Bros. (US) as the follow-up to his ninth album World Radio (1982). It was co-produced by the Grammy Award-winning Arif Mardin, in association with Alan Tarney, and Christopher Neil producing the other tracks. Sayer is credited as co-writer on the tracks "Don't Wait Until Tomorrow", and "Orchard Road".

The album reached number 15 on the UK Albums Chart, making it (including the compilation album, The Very Best of Leo Sayer) his eleventh successive Top 50 chart entry in the UK Albums Chart, in a period of over nine years. The album spawned three singles of which the first two reached the top 60 on the UK Singles Chart, including "Orchard Road", which would become one of Sayer's most popular songs to make the Top 20, peaking at number 16 and spending nine weeks on the chart.

== Track listing ==
Side one
No.	Title	Writer(s)	Length
1.	"Till You Come Back to Me"	Stevie Wonder; Clarence Paul; Morris Broadnax	4:05
2.	"Sea of Heartbreak"	Hal David; Paul Hampton	3:44
3.	"More Than I Can Say"	Sonny Curtis; Jerry Allison	3:41
4.	"Darlin'"	Brian Wilson; Mike Love	4:58
5.	"Don't Wait Until Tomorrow"	Leo Sayer; Alan Tarney	2:43
6.	"How Beautiful You Are"	Peter Blegvad; John Greaves	3:54
7.	"Orchard Road"	Sayer; Tarney	4:27

Side two
No.	Title	Writer(s)	Length
8.	"Aviation"	Thurston Clarke	4:27
9.	"Heart (Stop Beating in Time)"	Robin Gibb; Barry Gibb; Maurice Gibb	4:35
10.	"Your Love Still Brings Me to My Knees"	Roger Cook; B.F. Wood	3:01
11.	"Have You Ever Been in Love"	Andrew Hill; Peter Sinfield; John Danter	3:43
12.	"Wounded Heart"	Simon Climie; Carlene Carter	4:13
13.	"Love Games"	Tom McKay	3:47
14.	"Never Had a Dream Come True"	Sylvia Moy; Stevie Wonder; Henry Cosby	4:51

== Personnel ==
Credits are adapted from the album's liner notes.

- Leo Sayer – lead, harmony and background vocals
- Al Hodge – guitar
- Steve Khan – guitar
- Steve Lukather – guitar
- Hank Marvin – guitar
- Derek Austin – synthesizer
- Michael Boddicker – synthesizer
- Bob Christianson – synthesizer
- Ian Lynn – synthesizer
- Alan Tarney – synthesizer, bass guitar, guitar, background vocals
- James Stroud – Synclavier, LinnDrum programming
- Robbie Buchanan – piano
- Geoff Westley – piano
- Mo Foster – bass guitar
- Abraham Laboriel – bass guitar
- Will Lee – bass guitar
- Bob Jenkins – drums
- Jeff Porcaro – drums
- Casey Scheuerell – drums
- Trevor Spencer – drums
- Frank Ricotti – percussion, marimba
- Sharon Campbell – background vocals
- Alan Carvell – background vocals
- Steve George – background vocals
- John Kirby – background vocals
- Marcy Levy – background vocals
- Christopher Neil – background vocals
- Gordon Neville – background vocals
- Richard Page – background vocals
- Jackie Rawe – background vocals

=== Production ===
- Producers: Arif Mardin, Alan Tarney, Christopher Neil

== Charts ==
Chart (1983/84)	Peak Position
Australia (Kent Music Report)	20
UK Albums Chart	15
