= When the Music Stops =

When the Music Stops may refer to:

- When the Music Stops, an album by Daryl Coley
- "When the Music Stops", a song by Eminem from the album The Eminem Show
- "When the Music Stops", a 1973 song by Roger Daltrey from Daltrey
- When the Music Stops (Jaden Hossler album)
