= Supertramp (album) =

Studio album by Supertramp
- Released: August 1970
- Recorded: June 1970
- Studios: Morgan, Willesden
- Genres: Progressive pop; art rock
- Length: 47:31
- Label: A&M
- Producer: Supertramp

Supertramp chronology
Supertramp (1970)	Indelibly Stamped (1971)

Supertramp is the debut album by the British rock band Supertramp, released in August 1970. The first UK press was released under the title "And I'm Not Like Other", but this title was printed on the labels only. In some countries it was released under the titles Surely (Singapore), and Now and Then (Spain).

Supertramp was not released in the United States until late 1977. However, the album was available in the U.S. through importers; it was usually carried in record stores that specialised in British imports. The 1977 issue reached No. 158 on the US Billboard 200.

== Background and recording ==
All the album's lyrics were written by Richard Palmer, since none of the other members of Supertramp were willing to write any. Palmer himself later said that he considered writing lyrics "like having to do school work" at the time. The music to the songs were all composed jointly by Rick Davies and Roger Hodgson.

The album was recorded entirely at Morgan Studios in night sessions running from 12 midnight to 6 am, due to a superstition on the part of the band members (fuelled by their having heard that Traffic and Spooky Tooth recorded at late hours) that there was some "magic" to recording at night. Hodgson later recalled "Invariably our engineer, Robin Black, would fall asleep on us in the middle of the sessions, which were pretty intense as it was, because we fought a lot with Richard Palmer." He was fond of the resulting album, however, and commented over a decade later that "It was very naïve, but it has a good mood to it."

To promote the album, the band played at the Isle of Wight Festival 1970, held a few weeks after release.

As the songs for Supertramp's third album, Crime of the Century (1974), were introduced into the band's live set, the songs from Supertramp were mostly dropped, never to return. The two exceptions are "Home Again" and "Surely", which were occasionally played during encores for several years after. "Surely" has also been included on some of the band's compilation CDs.

Songs from this album, including "Words Unspoken" and "I Am Not Like Other Birds of Prey", were used as part of the soundtrack for the UK film Extremes (1971), along with music from other groups.

== Reception ==
Professional ratings
Review scores
Source	Rating
AllMusic	2/5 stars
Encyclopedia of Popular Music	2/5 stars
The Rolling Stone Album Guide	1/5 stars

The critical response to the album was generally positive, with a review by Judith Simons in Daily Express commenting: "This debut record album by a group of promising musician-poets is rather more melodic than most discs which pass under the label 'progressive pop.'" Despite this, the album was a commercial flop.

Retrospective reviews are more negative. In their review, AllMusic said the album was "inundated with pretentious instrumental meandering, with greater emphasis and attention granted to the keyboards and guitars than to the writing and to the overall effluence of the music." However, they admitted that the album's "mixture of ardour and subtlety" is appealing.

== Track listing ==
All lead vocals by Roger Hodgson, except where noted. Lead vocal credits per Richard Palmer.

All tracks are written by Rick Davies, Roger Hodgson and Richard Palmer.

Side one
No.	Title	Lead vocals	Length
1.	"Surely"		0:31
2.	"It's a Long Road"		5:33
3.	"Aubade / And I Am Not Like Other Birds of Prey"		5:17
4.	"Words Unspoken"		3:59
5.	"Maybe I'm a Beggar"	Palmer and Hodgson	6:44
6.	"Home Again"		1:15

Side two
No.	Title	Lead vocals	Length
7.	"Nothing to Show"	Hodgson and Davies	4:53
8.	"Shadow Song"	Davies	4:23
9.	"Try Again"	Hodgson and Palmer	12:02
10.	"Surely"		3:08
Total length:			47:31

== Personnel ==
Supertramp

- Richard Davies – organ (tracks 2–5, 7–10), piano (tracks 1, 7, 8, 10), electric piano (tracks 2, 7, 9), harmonica (track 2), backing and lead vocals
- Roger Hodgson – bass guitar, acoustic guitar (tracks 1, 6, 10), cello (tracks 3, 4), flageolet (tracks 5, 8, 9), lead and backing vocals
- Richard Palmer – electric guitar, acoustic guitar, balalaika (Track 4), backing and lead vocals
- Robert Millar – drums, percussion

Production

- Supertramp – producer
- Robin Black – engineer

== Charts ==
Chart (1978)	Peak position
US Billboard 200	158

Chart (2025)	Peak position
Greek Albums (IFPI)	42

== Certifications ==
Region	Certification	Certified units/sales
Canada (Music Canada)	Gold	50,000^{^}
France (SNEP)	Gold	100,000^{*}
^{*} Sales figures based on certification alone.^{^} Shipments figures based on certification alone.
