= The Least You Can Do =

Single by Phil Collins

from the album Testify
- B-side: "Hey, Now Sunshine"
- Released: 14 February 2003
- Recorded: 2001
- Genre: Pop rock
- Length: 4:21
- Label: Atlantic
- Composer: Daryl Stuermer
- Lyricist: Phil Collins
- Producers: Phil Collins, Rob Cavallo

Phil Collins singles chronology
| "Come with Me" (2003) | "The Least You Can Do" / "Wake Up Call" (2003) | "Home" (2003) |

Audio
- "Phil Collins - The Least You Can Do (2016 Remaster Official Audio)" on YouTube

"The Least You Can Do" is a song by the English singer Phil Collins. Originally released on his seventh solo album Testify (2002), it was issued in 2003 with "Wake Up Call" as a double A-side single.

The song was written and arranged with Daryl Stuermer, who also provided the arrangement for other songs in Collins' career, such as "Something Happened on the Way to Heaven".

== Track listing ==
UK single

1. "The Least You Can Do" – 4:23
2. "Wake Up Call" – 4:14
3. "Hey, Now Sunshine" – 5:02

European single

1. "The Least You Can Do" – 4:23
2. "Easy Lover" (live) – 5:02
3. "You Touch My Heart" - 4:42

== Credits ==
- Phil Collins – vocals, drums, percussion
- Jamie Muhoberac – keyboards
- Daryl Stuermer – lead guitar
- Tim Pierce – rhythm guitar
- Paul Bushnell – bass
- Eric Rigler – Uilleann pipes
- Arranged by Phil Collins and Daryl Stuermer

== Charts ==
2003 singles charts
| Chart | Peak position |
|---|---|
| Belgium (Ultratip Bubbling Under Flanders) | 12 |
| Belgium (Ultratip Bubbling Under Wallonia) | 14 |
| Netherlands (Single Top 100) | 78 |
