= Silverbird (album) =

Studio album by Leo Sayer
- Released: November 1973
- Recorded: 1971–1972
- Studio: The Barn, Sussex; Olympic Studios, London; Nova Studios, London
- Genre: Soft rock
- Length: 34:53
- Label: Chrysalis (UK); Warner Bros. (USA)
- Producer: David Courtney, Adam Faith

Leo Sayer chronology
Silverbird (1973)	Just a Boy (1974)

Professional ratings
Review scores
Source	Rating
AllMusic	3/5 stars
Christgau's Record Guide	B−

Silverbird is the debut solo studio album by the English singer-songwriter Leo Sayer. It was originally released in November 1973 by Chrysalis (UK), and Warner Bros. (US). It was co-produced by former British pop teen idol Adam Faith and David Courtney.

Sayer began his career as a recording artist under the management guidance of Adam Faith and David Courtney who signed Sayer to the Chrysalis label in the UK and Warner Bros. Records in the USA. His debut single "Why Is Everybody Going Home" failed to chart, but he shot to national prominence in the UK with his second single, the plaintive music hall-styled song "The Show Must Go On", which Sayer memorably performed on British television wearing a pierrot costume and make-up. The single went quickly to No. 2 on the UK chart, as did this debut album, for which Courtney and Sayer wrote all eleven tracks.

== Recording ==
The recording of Silverbird was a difficult and somewhat experimental process, Adam Faith and David Courtney had many ideas but no real experience in record production. The writers, Sayer and Courtney, were inspired however and the album started to come together at Virgin Records' Manor Studios in Shipton-on-Cherwell, Oxfordshire. Further recording took place at the Who's lead singer Roger Daltrey's Barn Studio, Burwash, East Sussex; Nova Studios and Olympic Studios; and later at the Beatles' Apple studios. At Daltrey's the recording took further shape with the team creating, amongst others, the unique "The Show Must Go On".

== Track listing ==
All lyrics by Leo Sayer, music by David Courtney.

=== Side one ===
1. "Innocent Bystander" – 3:02
2. "Goodnight Old Friend" – 2:50
3. "Drop Back" – 3:29
4. "Silverbird" – 1:12
5. "The Show Must Go On" – 3:32
6. "The Dancer" – 4:30

=== Side two ===
1. "Tomorrow" – 4:12
2. "Don't Say It's Over" – 3:15
3. "Slow Motion" – 1:44
4. "Oh Wot a Life" – 2:53
5. "Why Is Everybody Going Home" – 4:14

== Personnel ==
- Leo Sayer – guitar, harmonica, vocals
- Russ Ballard – guitar, keyboards
- Max Chetwyn – guitar on "Drop Back"
- David Courtney – piano
- Michael Giles – drums
- Robert Henrit – drums
- Henry Spinetti – drums
- Dave Wintour – bass guitar
- Del Newman – string arrangements

Technical

- Graham Hughes – sleeve concept, photography

== Production ==
- Record producer: David Courtney, Adam Faith
- Engineers: John Mills (Apple Studios). Richard Dodd, Keith Harwood, Tom Newman

== Charts ==
Chart (1974)	Peak position
Australian Albums (Kent Music Report)	14
UK Albums (OCC)	2

== Certifications ==
Region	Certification	Certified units/sales
Australia (ARIA)	Gold	20,000^{^}
United Kingdom (BPI)	Silver	60,000^{^}
^{^} Shipments figures based on certification alone.
