= Just a Boy =

Studio album by Leo Sayer
- Released: October 1974
- Recorded: 1974
- Studios: Kingsway Recorders, London
- Genre: Soft rock
- Length: 38:04
- Labels: Chrysalis (UK); Warner Bros. (US)
- Producers: David Courtney; Adam Faith

Leo Sayer chronology
Silverbird (1973)	Just a Boy (1974)	Another Year (1975)

Singles from Just a Boy
- 1. "One Man Band" Released: 31 May 1974; 2. "Long Tall Glasses (I Can Dance)" Released: September 1974; 3. "Train" Released: February 1975 (EU)

Professional ratings
Review scores
Source	Rating
AllMusic	4.5/5 stars
Christgau's Record Guide	C+
The Village Voice	C+

Just a Boy is the second studio album by the English singer-songwriter Leo Sayer, and was released in 1974. It features his interpretations of two songs ("One Man Band" and "Giving It All Away") that had been written by Sayer and David Courtney for the Who's lead vocalist Roger Daltrey's debut solo album, Daltrey. The latter song also began Sayer's run of hits in Australia; he subsequently emigrated there. His singles "One Man Band" and "Long Tall Glasses" both hit the charts in the UK and around the world. Leo Sayer was now popular in Europe and made many promotional appearances there. He headlined in Paris at the Théâtre des Champs-Élysées, the venue known as the home of his then hero, mime artist Marcel Marceau.

== Recording ==
Adam Faith, David Courtney and Leo Sayer began work on the album by cutting "One Man Band" whilst Sayer was on an American tour. More recording took place in London. This time the recording went smoothly and the right results were quickly accomplished. Some of the songs, like "Long Tall Glasses", were written in the studio. Sayer's songs "One Man Band" and "Giving It All Away" had previously been recorded by Roger Daltrey, for his 1973 debut solo album Daltrey.

A cover of the song "I Can Dance (Long Tall Glasses)" by the Canadian band Shooter hit the Canadian charts in the same week as the Sayer original. The Sayer version reached No. 18, where the Shooter version reached No. 22, both on the 3 May chart.

== Album cover artwork ==
The cover is a painting by Humphrey Butler-Bowdon. It is a tribute to Antoine de Saint-Exupéry's artwork for his famous novella The Little Prince. The album's back cover pointedly depicted a group of new Sayers giving Pierrot the elbow.

== Track listing ==
All lyrics by Leo Sayer and music by David Courtney.

=== Side one ===
1. "Telepath" – 3:12
2. "Train" – 4:25
3. "The Bells of St Mary's" – 3:36
4. "One Man Band" – 3:35
5. "In My Life" – 3:23

=== Side two ===
1. "When I Came Home This Morning" – 5:17
2. "Long Tall Glasses (I Can Dance)" – 3:19
3. "Another Time" – 3:26
4. "Solo" – 3:59
5. "Giving It All Away" – 3:52

== Personnel ==
- Leo Sayer – vocals
- David Courtney – acoustic piano (1, 8, 10)
- Cliff Hall – acoustic piano (2, 3, 7, 9)
- David Rose – acoustic piano (4, 5, 6)
- John Mealing – organ (5)
- Paul Keogh – guitars (2, 3, 5, 7, 8, 9)
- James Litherland – guitars (4, 5, 6)
- Keith Nelson – banjo (7)
- Dave Markee – bass (2, 3, 7, 8, 9)
- Bill Smith – bass (4, 5, 6)
- Theo Thunder – drums (2–7, 9)
- Michael Giles – drums (8)
- Andrew Powell – string, woodwind and brass arrangements
- Jeanie Greene – backing vocals
- Barry St. John – backing vocals (5)
- Liza Strike – backing vocals (5)
- Lucas Piccoli – inspiration

=== Production ===
- David Courtney – producer
- Adam Faith – producer
- Louis Austin – engineer
- Martin Birch – engineer
- George Sloan – tape operator
- Paul "Chas" Watkins – tape operator
- Terry O'Neill – photography, back cover conception
- Humphrey Butler-Bowdon – cover painting

== Charts ==
=== Weekly charts ===
Chart (1974–75)	Peak position
Australian Albums (Kent Music Report)	3
Canada Top Albums/CDs (RPM)	12
New Zealand Albums (RMNZ)	35
UK Albums (Official Charts)	4
US Billboard 200	16

=== Year-end charts ===
Chart (1975)	Peak position
Australian Albums (Kent Music Report)	2

== Certifications ==
Region	Certification	Certified units/sales
Australia (ARIA)	Platinum	50,000^{^}
United Kingdom (BPI)	Silver	60,000^{^}
^{^} Shipments figures based on certification alone.
