= Indelibly Stamped =

Studio album by Supertramp
- Released: 25 June 1971
- Recorded: April–May 1971
- Studios: Olympic Studios, London
- Genre: Art rock
- Length: 40:33
- Label: A&M
- Producer: Supertramp

Supertramp chronology
Supertramp (1970)	Indelibly Stamped (1971)	Crime of the Century (1974)

Indelibly Stamped is the second album by the British rock band Supertramp, released in 1971. It marked a dramatic change in direction to a more straightforward rock sound, and by admission of the band's own liner notes, "Travelled" is the only song with any resemblance to their debut album. Like their debut, this album was a commercial failure upon release; however, in later decades it went gold in France and Canada. Original editions have a colour gate-fold cover and different text for the band name and album title. The cover photograph features the tattooed torso and arms of a topless woman. This is the first Supertramp album issued in the U.S. The album was banned from a number of record stores in Australia, while others sold each copy inside a brown paper sleeve.

== Cover art ==
The cover depicts the tattooed torso and arms of a topless woman. According to Paul Sayce, writing in Tattoo News, the model was Marion Hollier, who was extensively tattooed at the Les Skuse Tattoo Studio in the 1960s. An article published in The People shortly after the album's release also identifies Hollier as the model, noting that she was paid £45 for the job (equivalent to £600 in 2025).

== Background ==
Roger Hodgson later said Indelibly Stamped was "the survival album to put ourselves back in the good books of our manager. There was no theme worked out for the album and we were floundering." New members Kevin Currie and Frank Farrell were recruited shortly before the recording sessions.

The song "Times Have Changed" evolved out of a song called "Times of Rain", which was written with Richard Palmer-James while he was still a member of the group. Rick Davies and Roger Hodgson wrote new lyrics to the song, renaming it "Times Have Changed".

Supporting tours for the album began with a series of shows at the P.N. Club in Munich, which had been the site for Supertramp's first public performances. Rick Davies described their stage show at the time as "all Rock and Roll really. We used to get people up on the bloody stage and it was just chaos, hopping away doing about three encores, but there was meat and potatoes behind it. No more or less people would come to the next gig." This was the last album Roger Hodgson played bass on during his tenure with Supertramp.

== Reception ==
Professional ratings
Review scores
Source	Rating
AllMusic	2/5 stars
Encyclopedia of Popular Music	2/5 stars
The Rolling Stone Album Guide	1/5 stars

In a brief retrospective review for AllMusic, Stephen Thomas Erlewine says that the album is an improvement over their debut, but still indulged too much in lengthy instrumental sections.

== Track listing ==
All lead vocals by Rick Davies, except where noted.

All tracks are written by Rick Davies and Roger Hodgson, except where noted.

Side one
No.	Title	Writer(s)	Lead vocals	Length
1.	"Your Poppa Don't Mind"			2:58
2.	"Travelled"		Hodgson	4:15
3.	"Rosie Had Everything Planned"	Hodgson, Frank Farrell	Hodgson	2:58
4.	"Remember"			4:00
5.	"Forever"			5:05

Side two
No.	Title	Lead vocals	Length
6.	"Potter"	Dave Winthrop	2:23
7.	"Coming Home to See You"		4:39
8.	"Times Have Changed"		3:42
9.	"Friend in Need"		2:08
10.	"Aries"	Hodgson	7:25
Total length:			40:33

- "Rosie Had Everything Planned" is the only original song in the entire Supertramp catalog for which Rick Davies receives no writing or co-writing credit.

== Personnel ==
Supertramp

- Rick Davies – acoustic and Wurlitzer pianos, Hammond organ, lead vocals, harmonica
- Roger Hodgson – acoustic and electric guitars, bass guitar (track 3), lead (tracks 2, 3, 10) and backing vocals
- Dave Winthrop – flute, saxophones, lead vocals (track 6)
- Frank Farrell – bass guitar (all tracks except track 3), piano and accordion (track 3), backing vocals
- Kevin Currie – percussion, drums

Production

- Producer: Supertramp
- Engineer: Bob Hall

== Charts ==
Chart (1976)	Peak position
Australian Albums (Kent Music Report)	53

== Certifications ==
Region	Certification	Certified units/sales
Canada (Music Canada)	Gold	50,000^{^}
France (SNEP)	Gold	100,000^{*}
^{*} Sales figures based on certification alone.^{^} Shipments figures based on certification alone.
