= Heart (Stop Beating in Time) =

Single by Leo Sayer

from the album World Radio
- B-side: "The End Of The Game"
- Released: 1982
- Length: 4:02
- Label: Chrysalis, Warner Bros
- Songwriters: Barry Gibb, Robin Gibb, Maurice Gibb
- Producer: Arif Mardin

Leo Sayer singles chronology
"Have You Ever Been in Love" (1982)	"Heart (Stop Beating in Time)" (1982)	"Paris Dies in the Morning" (1982)

“Heart (Stop Beating in Time)” is a song by the English singer-songwriter Leo Sayer, released from his ninth album World Radio. The song was written by Barry Gibb, Robin Gibb and Maurice Gibb, famed for their work as the trio The Bee Gees, and was produced by Arif Mardin. The song was later recorded by the Canadian singer Véronique Béliveau with French lyrics as "Please (Dis-moi c’que tu as)".

== Background ==
The song "Heart (Stop Beating in Time)" was originally written by Gibb brothers during the songwriting sessions for their album Living Eyes, however, the song was not included on the final pressing of the album. Instead, Barry Gibb offered the song to Leo Sayer with whom the song was originally written for in mind. Its composition is noted for the "soft, sensual style" that the Bee Gees had become known for throughout much of their career. Barry Gibb acknowledged that the sound was similar to that of Sayer and had also become known for a similar sound during his career.

== Release ==
The song was released as the second single from World Radio, Sayer's ninth studio album, in 1982. The single was issued by Chrysalis and Warner Bros. Records. It was later included on Sayer's 1993 compilation album All the Best, as well as other subsequent compilation album releases such as The Best of Leo Sayer (2002) and Endless Journey – The Essential Leo Sayer (2004).

In the United Kingdom, "Heart (Stop Beating in Time)" debuted at number 73 on the UK Singles Charts on 13 June 1982. The following week, it climbed into the Top 40, reaching number 38 and by its third week of release, had climbed again to number 26. It remained in the UK Top 30 for a further two weeks before reaching its peak position of number 22 on 18 July 1982. It spent a further four weeks on the UK Singles Chart, making a total of ten weeks on that listing.

In Ireland, the song first appeared on the Irish Singles Chart on 4 July 1982 and spent a total of six weeks on that chart following a peak position of number 17.

== Music video ==
The music video for "Heart (Stop Beating in Time)" begins with a dark screen in which a shadowy figure of Sayer appears with a light blue glow around him. At the beginning of the video, Sayer is laying down and the camera begins panning on closely on Sayer's face. By the chorus of the song, Sayer appears fully, still with the blue glow surrounding him in order to make him stand out more from the dark background featured in the video. The video ends with Sayer once again laying down on the floor with a posing position, similar to the shot at the beginning of the video.

== Cover versions ==
Since its original release by Sayer in 1982, "Heart (Stop Beating in Time)" has been covered by others – Stevie Woods who released his version in November 1983, followed by a version by Marilyn McCoo, also released in 1983. Bruce Murray released a version of the song in November 1984, followed by one issued by Josephine Hoenjet in 1985.

A demo recorded by the Bee Gees from 1981 was uploaded to YouTube in July 2016.

== Track listings ==
A – "Heart (Stop Beating In Time)" (Written by – Barry, Robin and Maurice Gibb)
B – "The End Of The Game" (Written by – D Courtney, L Sayer)

== Chart performance ==
Chart (1982)	Peak position
Australia (Kent Music Report)	71
Ireland (IRMA)	17
United Kingdom (OCC)	22

== See also ==
- List of unreleased material recorded by the Bee Gees
