= Wake Up Call (Phil Collins song) =

Single by Phil Collins

from the album Testify
- B-side: "Hey, Now Sunshine"
- Released: 17 March 2003 (UK)
- Recorded: 2002
- Genre: Pop rock
- Label: Atlantic
- Songwriter: Phil Collins
- Producers: Phil Collins, Rob Cavallo

Phil Collins singles chronology
"Come with Me" (2003)	"The Least You Can Do" / "Wake Up Call" (2003)	"Home" (2003)

Music video
- "Phil Collins - Wake Up Call (Official Music Video)" on YouTube

"Wake Up Call" is a double A-side 2003 single release by English drummer Phil Collins from his seventh solo album Testify, released in 2002. The song was released in a double A-side format alongside "The Least You Can Do".

The music video made for "Wake Up Call", showed Collins waking early and going around Geneva giving a wake-up call to local residents. Before long, a crowd gathers to follow him and starts to pester him with questions, of which the last question enquires about a possible Genesis reunion, to which Collins shakes his head and makes a funny face. However, he did re-unite with the band in 2007 for Turn It On Again: The Tour. The question about the reunion was meant to be asked by Tony Smith, the manager of both Phil Collins and Genesis, but when he refused to appear on camera, it was posed by the video's producer, Paul Flattery. Flattery and his director/partner Jim Yukich had made virtually all the videos, concert films and television specials for both Phil and Genesis since the early '80s.

The song failed to make a huge impact on the charts, suffering from the poor reception Testify received upon release.

== Track listing ==
UK single

1. "The Least You Can Do" – 4:23
2. "Wake Up Call" – 4:14
3. "Hey, Now Sunshine" – 5:02

European single

1. "Wake Up Call" – 4:14
2. "Tears of a Clown" – 3:25
3. "Hey, Now Sunshine" – 5:02

== Credits ==
=== "Wake Up Call" ===
- All instruments played by Phil Collins except:
- Tim Pierce – guitars
- James Sanger – additional programming
- Arranged by Phil Collins and Daryl Stuermer

== Charts ==
Chart (2003)	Peak position
Dutch Singles Chart	78
German Singles Chart	87
UK Singles Chart	86

== Notes ==
- The Least You Can Do / Wake Up Call at Discogs
