= Georges Thurston =

Black Canadian singer and author (1951–2007)

Background information
- Also known as: Boule Noire
- Born: December 29, 1951; Bedford, Quebec, Canada
- Origin: Saint-Jérôme, Québec, Canada
- Died: June 18, 2007 (aged 55)
- Genres: Reggae, R&B, Disco, Yé-yé, Soul
- Years active: 1965–2006
- Labels: Magique, Zion Yant

Georges Thurston (December 29, 1951 – June 18, 2007) was an Afro-Québécois singer, author and composer and radio show host. He was known as Boule Noire (literal translation: "Black Ball") since 1975 and worked in the music industry as a solo artist for nearly 30 years and as part of musical groups for five years.

== Early years ==
Born in Bedford, Quebec, Thurston later moved to Saint-Jerome, Quebec, where he formed his first band in 1965 called Les Zinconnus and produced R&B music, his favourite musical genre. In 1969, he moved on to join the band Le 25e Régiment and remained with the group until the early 1970s.

In the 1970s, he worked with several other Québec artists, including Robert Charlebois, Claude Dubois, Tony Roman, Nanette Workman and Michel Pagliaro. He played the piano, bass and guitar. He would later be a composer for the hit Franco-Canadian R&B group Toulouse (groupe). He is also featured as backup singer, on a 45 rpm single titled Hey Lord-Valentine (1972 release) by local singer-songwriter Robert Salagan.

== Solo career ==
Thurston's solo career started in 1976 when he released his first solo album titled Boule Noire. It included his first hit, "Aimes-tu la vie?" During his 30-year solo career, he produced at least 14 albums in both English and French. His first English album, entitled Premiere, was recorded in 1980.

Thurston was one of the prominent figures in dance and R&B music in Quebec during the 1970s and 1980s and covered songs by other artists, including the Beatles song "Let It Be", in 1995. He also represented Canada at several international music festivals, including Marseille in 1976 and UCLA in 1988.

Thurston's 1978 album Aimer d'Amour was certified triple platinum. The title song, a cover of Leo Sayer's "Easy to Love", would later gain success in the early 1990s when 800,000 copies were sold in Europe.

Thurston became a radio show host for Montreal's Rythme FM radio station in 2000.

== Biography book ==
Just prior to Thurston's death he released his autobiography called Aimes-tu la vie? after his first hit single. He revealed that he had often been ostracized and mistreated. He also said that during his teenage years he nearly became a criminal, but that music helped him to survive through tough times.

== Death ==
Thurston died of colorectal cancer on June 18, 2007, in Montreal. He learned of his cancer in early 2006. He finished recording his last album later that year after extensive chemotherapy operations.

== Bibliography ==
- Aimes-tu la vie? – autobiography (2007)

== Discography ==
- Boule Noire (1976)
- Les années passent (1977)
- Aimer d'Amour (1978)
- Il me faut une femme (1979)
- Love me please love me (1980)
- Premiere (1980)
- Primitif (1980)
- Boule Noire Reggae (1982)
- Le tour des îles (1987)
- Résolution (1991)
- Soul Pleureur (1992)
- Let it be (1995)
- Réunion (2003)
- Last call (2006)
