= Cool Touch =

Studio album by Leo Sayer
- Released: 9 July 1990
- Recorded: 1990
- Studio: RG Jones, London; mixed at Mayfair Studios, London
- Genre: Pop, dance-pop, pop rock
- Label: EMI – (United Kingdom); Electrola – (Germany)
- Producer: Alan Tarney

Leo Sayer chronology
Have You Ever Been in Love (1983)	Cool Touch (1990)	All the Best (1993)

Cool Touch is an album by the English singer-songwriter Leo Sayer, released in 1990. It was only released in the United Kingdom, Australia and Germany. It was his first album release since 1983's Have You Ever Been in Love.

== Background ==
According to his own website, Sayer said

Producer Alan Tarney and I were big dance music fans, so we went back into the studio to celebrate that. I guess this was the moment that all my James Brown influences bore fruit, and as always with Alan, we were knocking on the door of the current computer advances of the time. Now it was becoming scary what just two guys in the studio could do, so we had a lot of fun creating this. The album wasn't a big release, but that took the pressure off, so there's a lot of wild creative stuff here. "I Can’t Stop" is a disco burner, "Rely On Me" is almost gospel, "Paperback Town" is political and I still don't know how to describe "Suki’s Missing", but it's all very cool.

== Track listing ==
All songs written by Leo Sayer and Alan Tarney.

1. "Cool Touch" – 4:18
2. "Rely On Me" – 3:53
3. "Young And in Love" – 3:33
4. "Paper Back Town" – 4:24
5. "Going Home" – 4:28
6. "My Favourite" – 3:21
7. "I Can't Stop" – 4:17
8. "Heaven Knows" – 4:12
9. "Agents of the Heart" – 3:09
10. "Suki's Missing" – 3:49

== Personnel ==
- Producer: Alan Tarney
- Arrangement: Ben Robbins
- Engineer: Gerry Kitchingham
