= Meck (musician) =

British DJ

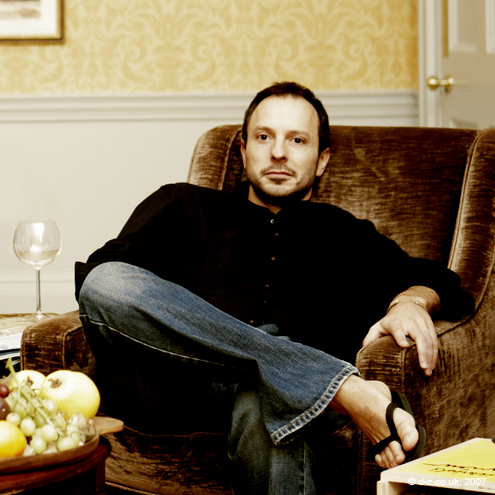

Background information
- Also known as: Meck
- Born: Craig Dimech; September 1970 (age 55)
- Origin: London, England
- Genres: House, dance
- Occupations: Producer, DJ, A&R, label owner
- Years active: 1996–present

Craig Dimech (born September 1970), known by his stage name Meck, is a British DJ who was the former head of free2air recordings and later Frenetic Recordings. He appeared at number 90 the DJ Mag Top 100 DJs list in 1999.

Known initially for the re-working of Leo Sayer's "Thunder in My Heart Again", he has gone on to forge a partnership with Italian vocalist, producer and DJ Dino Lenny.

== Discography ==
=== Singles ===
List of singles, with selected chart positions
Title	Year	Peak chart positions			
Title	Year	UK	AUS	FIN	NLD
"Thunder in My Heart Again" (featuring Leo Sayer)	2006	1	16	11	11
"Feels Like Home" (featuring Dino)	2007	39	60	9	35
"So Strong" (featuring Dino)	2008	—	—	—	49
"Windmills"	2009	—	—	—	—
"Feels Like a Prayer" (featuring Dino)	2010	—	—	—	9

- "Feels Like Home" samples "Don't You Want Me" by Felix
- "So Strong" samples "Hold That Sucker Down" by OT Quartet
- "Windmills" samples "The Windmills of Your Mind" by Dusty Springfield
- "Feels Like a Prayer" is a mashup of "Like a Prayer" by Madonna and "Feels Like Home"
