= Daltrey (album) =

Studio album by Roger Daltrey
- Released: 20 April 1973
- Recorded: January–February 1973
- Studios: Barn; Apple; Nova
- Genres: Rock; soft rock
- Labels: MCA (US); Track (UK)
- Producers: David Courtney; Adam Faith

Roger Daltrey chronology
Daltrey (1973)	Ride a Rock Horse (1975)

Singles from Daltrey
- 1. "Giving It All Away" Released: April 1973; 2. "Thinking" Released: September 1973; 3. "It's a Hard Life" Released: November 1973 (NL); 4. "One Man Band" Released: January 1974 (Ger.)

Daltrey is the debut solo studio album by the English rock singer Roger Daltrey, lead vocalist of the Who. It was released on 20 April 1973 by Track Records in the United Kingdom and MCA Records in the United States. Daltrey was the third member of the group to make a solo album. The bulk of the record (ten of the twelve songs) was written by David Courtney and Leo Sayer. It took six weeks to record during January and February 1973. Sessions took place at Daltrey's Barn Studio, Burwash, East Sussex, where the backing tracks were laid down; vocals, overdubs, and mixing was completed at the Beatles' Apple Studios at 3 Savile Row (the vocals for "One Man Band (reprise)" were recorded on the Apple rooftop, where the Beatles had performed their famous final concert in January 1969), and at Nova Sound Studios.

The album was recorded during a hiatus in the Who's touring schedule. The first single released from the album, "Giving It All Away", reached number five in the UK and the album made the Top 50 in the United States. He also released a single in 1973, "Thinking"; its B-side, "There is Love", features Jimmy Page of Led Zeppelin on guitar. Bizarrely, the British release, with considerable airplay of "Giving It All Away" (first lines "I paid all my dues so I picked up my shoes, I got up and walked away") coincided with news reports of the Who being sued for unpaid damage to their hotel on a recent tour, including a television set being thrown out of the window.

David Courtney and former British pop teen idol Adam Faith co-produced the album.

== Cover artwork ==
The album was packaged in a gatefold sleeve, photographed and designed by Daltrey's cousin Graham Hughes, featuring a Victorian locket-style soft-focus image, portraying Daltrey with Pre-Raphaelite looks. The inner-sleeve photography shows a trompe-l'œil in reference to the Narcissus myth, as Daltrey's reflection in the water differs from his real appearance. The cover itself features an image of Daltrey also shown in the film Tommy (1975).

== Album background ==
The success of the album caused some upheavals behind the scenes. With Pete Townshend being generally regarded as the Who's mouthpiece, Daltrey's renewed confidence now placed him in a strong position to influence the group policy. The Who's management team, Kit Lambert and Chris Stamp, were reportedly concerned that the album might spell the end of the Who or at the very least, a Rod Stewart and the Faces-type situation where the singer's solo success eclipsed the parent band. To Daltrey, at the time, these fears were misplaced. "I think it will do the Who some good if it's a hit, and I think there's a market for my album", he told Chris Charlesworth. The fact that Lambert and Stamp tried to derail the album's chances for the aforementioned reasons, and their increasingly erratic handling of the group's affairs, meant that their days as the Who's managers were numbered in Daltrey's eyes. He entrusted his affairs to Track employee Bill Curbishley who was fast rising through the ranks, having already successfully renegotiated the terms of a European Who tour the previous year.

== Composition ==
All but two of the songs were co-written by the previously unknown David Courtney and Leo Sayer, the latter of whom later became a well-known singer in his own right. At the time, Daltrey was playing in his home recording studio with Sayer, who told Daltrey about his struggles to get a recording contract. Daltrey, joking, asked Sayer to write him some songs for a solo album. Sayer and Courtney came back with ten songs, which Daltrey recorded for his first solo album.

Sayer enjoyed greater chart success than Daltrey did as a solo artist; the opening track on this album, "One Man Band" (also reprised at the end), became one of Sayer's biggest hits.

== Critical reception ==
Professional ratings
Review scores
Source	Rating
AllMusic	4/5 stars
Creem	C

In a contemporary review for Creem, Robert Christgau said "by anybody else, this would be one more dumb concept album, and it still is." He found its exploration of the musician's plight pitiful, and believed Daltrey lacked "the personality or the smarts to assert himself as an interpreter". In a retrospective review, AllMusic's Dave Thompson said that the album was "a sometimes horrifying shock for die-hard fans, but a pleasant surprise for anyone tired of hearing him voice the increasingly dictatorial Townshend's self-aggrandizement".

== Track listing ==
All tracks are written by David Courtney and Leo Sayer, except where noted.

Side one
No.	Title	Writer(s)	Length
1.	"One Man Band"		3:54
2.	"The Way of the World"	Adam Faith; David Courtney	3:16
3.	"You Are Yourself"		4:13
4.	"Thinking"		4:27
5.	"You and Me"	Adam Faith; David Courtney	2:32

Side two
No.	Title	Length
6.	"It's a Hard Life"	3:39
7.	"Giving It All Away"	3:26
8.	"The Story So Far"	4:08
9.	"When the Music Stops"	3:12
10.	"Reasons"	3:50
11.	"One Man Band" (Reprise)	1:18

=== Non-album material ===
No.	Title	Length
1.	"There Is Love" (B-side of "Thinking", and released as a bonus track on the 2005 remaster)	4:39

== Personnel ==
A promotional poster for the album

Musicians

- Roger Daltrey – lead vocals, acoustic guitar
- David Courtney – piano
- Russ Ballard – guitar, piano on "The Story So Far"
- Bob Henrit – drums
- Dave Wintour – bass guitar

Additional musicians

- Brian Cole – steel guitar
- Roy Young Band – brass
- Dave Arbus – violin on "The Way of the World"
- Jimmy Page – guitar on out-take "There Is Love"

Technical

- Del Newman – string arrangements on "You Are Yourself", "You and Me", "It's a Hard Life" and "Giving it All Away"
- John Mills – recording engineer Apple Studios & Burwash
- Richard Dubb – recording engineer for strings
- George Peckham – cutting engineer
- Nigel Oliver – tape operator

== Charts ==
Chart (1973)	Peak position
Australian Albums (Kent Music Report)	59
Canada Top Albums/CDs (RPM)	41
UK Albums (Official Charts)	6
US Billboard 200	45

== Certifications ==
Region	Certification	Certified units/sales
United Kingdom (BPI)	Silver	60,000^{^}
^{^} Shipments figures based on certification alone.

== See also ==
- Roger Daltrey discography
