= Long Tall Glasses (I Can Dance) =

Single by Leo Sayer

from the album Just a Boy
- B-side: "In My Life"
- Released: 1974
- Recorded: 1974
- Genre: Soft rock
- Length: 3:05
- Label: Chrysalis (UK); Warner (US)
- Songwriters: Leo Sayer; David Courtney
- Producers: Adam Faith; David Courtney

Leo Sayer singles chronology
"One Man Band" (1974)	"Long Tall Glasses (I Can Dance)" (1974)	"Train" (1975)

"Long Tall Glasses (I Can Dance)" is a 1974 song by Leo Sayer, co-written with David Courtney. It was released in the United Kingdom in late 1974, becoming Sayer's third hit record on both the British and Irish singles charts and reaching number four in both nations. It was included on Sayer's album Just a Boy.

The song also became a Top 10 hit internationally in early 1975, reaching number 7 in Australia and number 9 in the United States. It had a lesser showing in Canada (number 18), where a competing version had also been released.

== Shooter version ==
A cover of the song ("I Can Dance") by the Canadian band Shooter, released concurrently with Sayer's version, became a hit in Canada. Their version reached number 22, debuting on the charts the same week as Sayer's version.

== Chart history ==
=== Year-end charts ===
Leo Sayer

Chart (1974–75)	Peak position
Australia (Kent Music Report)	7
Canada RPM Top Singles	18
Ireland (IRMA)	4
South Africa (Springbok)	9
UK Singles (OCC)	4
U.S. Billboard Hot 100	9
U.S. Cash Box Top 100	6

Chart (1974)	Rank
UK	75

Chart (1975)	Rank
Australia (Kent Music Report)	54
Canada	146
U.S. Billboard Hot 100	90

Shooter cover

Chart (1975)	Peak position
Canada RPM Top Singles	22

Chart (1975)	Rank
Canada	129
