= Thunder in My Heart =

1977 studio album by Leo Sayer

Studio album by Leo Sayer
- Released: 30 September 1977
- Recorded: 1977
- Genres: Disco, soft rock
- Length: 35:13
- Labels: Chrysalis (UK); Warner Bros. (US)
- Producer: Richard Perry

Leo Sayer chronology
Endless Flight (1976)	Thunder in My Heart (1977)	Leo Sayer (1978)

Singles from Thunder in My Heart
- 1. "Thunder in My Heart" Released: August 1977; 2. "Easy to Love" Released: December 1977

Professional ratings
Review scores
Source	Rating
AllMusic	3/5 stars
Christgau's Record Guide	C

Thunder in My Heart is the fifth album by the English singer-songwriter Leo Sayer, released in 1977 and produced by Richard Perry. The title track and "Easy to Love" both reached the top 40 in the U.S.

== Track listing ==
=== Side one ===
1. "Thunder in My Heart" (Leo Sayer, Tom Snow) – 3:37
2. "Easy to Love" (Sayer, Albert Hammond) – 3:43
3. "Leave Well Enough Alone" (Kerry Chater, Snow) – 3:15
4. "I Want You Back" (Sayer, Hammond) – 4:28
5. "It's Over" (Sayer, Snow) – 3:48

=== Side two ===
1. "Fool for Your Love" (Sayer, Michael Omartian) – 3:26
2. "World Keeps on Turning" (Sayer, Omartian) – 3:25
3. "There Isn't Anything" (John Vastano) – 3:14
4. "Everything I've Got" (Snow, Vastano) – 2:39
5. "We Can Start All Over Again" (Sayer, Bruce Roberts, Snow) – 3:38

== Personnel ==
=== Musicians ===
- Leo Sayer – guitar, harmonica, vocals
- David Paich – piano, keyboards
- Ben Adkins, David Hungate, Abraham Laboriel – bass guitar
- Jack Ashford – percussion
- Larry Carlton, Jay Graydon, Ray Parker Jr., Lee Ritenour, Fred Tackett – guitar
- Lenny Castro – conductor, congas
- Bobbye Hall – percussion, tabla
- Pat Henderson – background vocals
- Bobby Kimball – background vocals
- Clydie King – background vocals
- Becky Lewis – vocals, background vocals
- Sherlie Matthews – vocals
- Ira Newborn – guitar, rhythm guitar
- James Newton Howard – keyboards
- Michael Omartian – piano, keyboards
- Jeff Porcaro – drums
- Petsye Powell – background vocals
- Tom Scott – saxophone
- Tom Snow – piano

=== Production ===
- Record producer: Richard Perry

== Charts ==
Chart performance for Thunder in My Heart
Chart (1977–1978)	Peak position
Australian Albums (Kent Music Report)	8
New Zealand Albums (RMNZ)	11
Norwegian Albums (VG-lista)	14
Swedish Albums (Sverigetopplistan)	19
UK Albums Chart	8
US Pop Albums	37

== Certifications ==
Certifications for Thunder in My Heart
Region	Certification	Certified units/sales
United Kingdom (BPI)	Gold	100,000^{^}
^{^} Shipments figures based on certification alone.
