= Another Year (Leo Sayer album) =

Studio album by Leo Sayer
- Released: 5 September 1975
- Recorded: 1975
- Studios: Kingsway Recorders, London
- Genre: Soft rock
- Length: 38:59
- Labels: Chrysalis (UK); Warner Bros. (US)
- Producers: Russ Ballard, Adam Faith

Leo Sayer chronology
Just a Boy (1974)	Another Year (1975)	Endless Flight (1976)

Professional ratings
Review scores
Source	Rating
Christgau's Record Guide	B−

Another Year is the third studio album by the English singer-songwriter Leo Sayer, which was released in 1975. It peaked at number 8 in the UK albums chart.

== Track listing ==
All songs written by Leo Sayer and Frank Farrell.

=== Side one ===
1. "Bedsitterland" – 4:07
2. "Unlucky in Love" – 3:27
3. "The Last Gig of Johnny B Goode" – 3:49
4. "On the Old Dirt Road" – 4:01
5. "I Will Not Stop Fighting" – 5:00

=== Side two ===
1. "Moonlighting" – 4:13
2. "The Streets of Your Town" – 3:02
3. "The Kid's Grown Up" – 2:52
4. "Only Dreaming" – 5:15
5. "Another Year" – 3:13

== Personnel ==
Musicians

- Leo Sayer – slide guitar, vocals
- Russ Ballard – piano, organ, marimba
- Frank Farrell – piano, accordion
- Michael Giles – drums
- David Katz Orchestra – violin, orchestra
- Pip Williams – orchestration
- Paul Keogh – guitar
- Dave Markee – bass guitar
- Nick Newell – flute
- Terry Starr – trumpet
- Johnny Van Derek – violin

Technical

- Louis Austin, Paul "Chas" Watkins – engineer
- Terry O'Neill – photography

Production

- Record producer: Russ Ballard, Adam Faith

== Charts ==
Chart (1975–76)	Peak position
Australian Albums (Kent Music Report)	3
UK Albums (Official Charts)	8
US Billboard 200	125

== Certifications ==
Region	Certification	Certified units/sales
Australia (ARIA)	Platinum	50,000^{^}
United Kingdom (BPI)	Silver	60,000^{^}
^{^} Shipments figures based on certification alone.
