= Leo Sayer (album) =

Studio album by Leo Sayer
- Released: 11 August 1978
- Recorded: 1978
- Genre: Country pop
- Length: 36:39
- Label: Chrysalis (UK); Warner Bros. (US)
- Producer: Richard Perry

Leo Sayer chronology
| Thunder in My Heart (1977) | Leo Sayer (1978) | The Very Best of Leo Sayer (1979) |

Leo Sayer is the sixth album by the English-Australian singer-songwriter Leo Sayer, released in 1978.

The song "I Can't Stop Loving You (Though I Try)" became a hit when Phil Collins recorded it in 2002.

== Critical reception ==
Professional ratings
Review scores
| Source | Rating |
|---|---|
| AllMusic | 3/5 stars |
| Christgau's Record Guide | C+ |

The Globe and Mail wrote that Sayer "has fully abandoned the style which pushed him on to the charts, a pop-disco hybrid... In its place, he has recently offered a plate full of mellow tunes, geared primarily to show off his vocal chords, which have in the past played second fiddle to large orchestras."

AllMusic noted that "this album is one of the artist's most respectable in a large body of good work".

== Track listing ==
=== Side one ===
1. "Stormy Weather" (Leo Sayer, Tom Snow) - 4:06
2. "Dancing the Night Away" (Russell Smith, James H. Brown, Jr.) (Amazing Rhythm Aces cover) - 4:05
3. "I Can't Stop Loving You (Though I Try)" (Billy Nicholls) - 3:29
4. "La Booga Rooga" (Andy Fairweather Low) (Andy Fairweather Low cover) - 3:40
5. "Raining in My Heart" (Felice and Boudleaux Bryant) (Buddy Holly cover) - 3:16

=== Side two ===
1. "Something Fine" (Jackson Browne) (Jackson Browne cover) - 3:32
2. "Running to My Freedom" (Tom Snow, Johnny Vastano) - 3:19
3. "Frankie Lee" (Sayer, Ray Parker Jr.) - 3:19
4. "Don't Look Away" (Sayer, Snow) - 3:30
5. "No Looking Back" (Sayer, Snow) - 2:58

== Personnel ==
- Leo Sayer – guitar, harmonica, vocals, background vocals
- Ben Benay, Jay Graydon, Davey Johnstone, Ray Parker Jr., Dean Parks, Fred Tackett – guitar
- Ollie E. Brown – percussion
- Jackson Browne – performer
- Lindsey Buckingham – guitar, vocals on "Something Fine"
- Michael Carnahan – horn
- Lenny Castro – percussion, conductor
- Bill Champlin – vocals, background vocals
- Scott Edwards, Chuck Rainey, Leland Sklar – bass guitar
- Andy Fairweather-Low – performer
- Richard Felts – horn
- Jim Gilstrap – vocals, background vocals
- Bobby Kimball – vocals, background vocals
- Russ Kunkel – drums
- David Lindley – mandolin, violin, steel guitar
- Steve Lukather, Waddy Wachtel – guitar, electric guitar
- James Newton Howard – clavinet
- David Paich – piano, keyboards
- Greg Phillinganes – piano, keyboards
- Jeff Porcaro – drums, percussion
- Steve Porcaro – synthesizer
- Tom Saviano – saxophone
- Tom Snow – piano, background vocals
- James Stroud – producer, drums, synthesizer programming

=== Production ===
- Record producer: Richard Perry
- Horn arrangements: Tom Saviano
- Engineer: Bill Schnee

== Charts ==
| Chart (1978/79) | Peak Position |
|---|---|
| Australia (Kent Music Report) | 8 |
| UK Albums Chart | 15 |
| US Pop Albums | 101 |
