= Easy to Love (Leo Sayer song) =

Single by Leo Sayer

from the album Thunder in My Heart
- B-side: "Haunting Me"
- Released: December 1977
- Recorded: 1977
- Genre: Pop, soft rock
- Length: 3:44
- Label: Island
- Songwriters: Leo Sayer, Albert Hammond
- Producer: Richard Perry

Leo Sayer singles chronology
"Thunder in My Heart" (1977)	"Easy to Love" (1977)	"Raining in My Heart" (1978)

"Easy to Love" is a song recorded by Leo Sayer for the album Thunder in My Heart, and originally released as a single in 1977. It was co-written by Sayer with Albert Hammond. It was the second single from the LP, the follow-up to the title track.

"Easy to Love" reached number 36 in the United States and number 35 in Canada. It did best in New Zealand, where it spent 10 weeks in the Top 40 and peaked at number 19.

== Reception ==
Cash Box magazine said "The second single from the Thunder in My Heart LP has a strong R&B/disco flavour to it and features the Sayer falsetto that has been so popular on his last two or three hits".

== Personnel ==
- Leo Sayer – vocals
- Jeff Porcaro – drums
- Ben Adkins – bass
- Lee Ritenour – guitars
- Ray Parker – guitars
- Michael Omartian – piano
- Bobbye Hall – percussion
- David Paich – string section arranger and conductor

== Chart history ==
Chart (1977–78)	Peak position
Canada RPM Top Singles	35
New Zealand (RIANZ)	19
U.S. Pop Singles	36

== Cover versions ==
- The song was re-recorded in Spanish by singer Lani Hall as "Es Fácil Amar," and appeared as the title track of her 1985 Latin Grammy Award-winning album of the same name, produced by Hammond.
- A French language version recorded in 1978 by Georges Thurston would later gain success in the early 1990s when 800,000 copies were sold in Europe.
- An untranslated (English) version was recorded by Ukrainian vocal-instrumental group "Чарівні Гітари" ("Magic Guitars") and released in 1980.
