= I Can't Stop Loving You (Though I Try) =

1977 song by White Horse

Song by White Horse

from the album White Horse
- Released: 1977
- Genre: Pop rock; soft rock
- Length: 3:35
- Label: Capitol
- Songwriter: William Nicholls

"I Can't Stop Loving You (Though I Try)" is a song written by singer-songwriter William Nicholls and first recorded by his short-lived project, White Horse – a collaboration between himself, Kenny Altman, and Jon Lind – and featured on the group's 1977 self-titled album.

The following year, Leo Sayer featured a version on his self-titled album on the Chrysalis label. It reached number six on the UK Singles Chart and was classified silver. In 2002, Phil Collins also covered the song, as "Can't Stop Loving You". His version reached number 28 on the UK Singles Chart. For other versions of the song, see section below.

== Release history ==
"I Can't Stop Loving You (Though I Try)"
- Netherlands picture sleeve

Single by Leo Sayer

from the album Leo Sayer
- B-side: "No Looking Back"
- Released: 23 June 1978
- Genre: Pop rock; soft rock; country
- Label: Chrysalis
- Songwriter: William Nicholls
- Producer: Richard Perry

Leo Sayer singles chronology
"Thunder in My Heart" (1977)	"I Can't Stop Loving You (Though I Try)" (1978)	"Raining in My Heart" (1978)

The Leo Sayer single was released in 1978 with "No Looking Back" as the b-side.

=== Charts ===
Chart (1978)	Peak position
Australia (Kent Music Report)	37
South Africa (Springbok)	18
UK Singles Chart	6

== Personnel ==
- Leo Sayer – vocals
- Greg Phillinganes – piano
- Steve Porcaro – synthesizers
- Waddy Wachtel – electric guitar and acoustic guitar
- Leland Sklar – bass
- Russ Kunkel – drums
- Lenny Castro – congas
- David Campbell – string arrangements

== Phil Collins version ==
"Can't Stop Loving You"

Single by Phil Collins

from the album Testify
- B-side: "High Flying Angel"
- Released: 28 October 2002
- Recorded: 2001
- Genre: Pop rock; soft rock
- Label: Atlantic
- Songwriter: William Nicholls
- Producers: Phil Collins; Rob Cavallo

Phil Collins singles chronology
"In the Air Tonite" (2001)	"Can't Stop Loving You" (2002)	"Come with Me" (2003)

Music video
- "Phil Collins - Can't Stop Loving You (Official Music Video)" on YouTube

"Can't Stop Loving You" was the lead single from English singer Phil Collins' solo album Testify, released in late 2002. It also appeared on Collins' 2004 album Love Songs: A Compilation... Old and New. Although it received minor airplay on mainstream U.S. Pop stations, the song became Collins' eighth number-one Billboard adult contemporary hit. The song also reached the Top 10 of the Eurochart.

Collins originally recorded the song in 2000 for a love songs project, along with "The Least You Can Do", but both tracks were released on Testify instead. Collins' version has some minor changes in the lyrics and introduces a bridge after the second chorus.

=== Track listing ===
1. "Can't Stop Loving You" – 4:18
2. "High Flying Angel" (U.S. single and Japan Testify only) – 4:44

=== Charts ===
==== Weekly charts ====
Chart (2002–03)	Peak position
Austria (Ö3 Austria Top 40)	23
Belgium (Ultratop 50 Flanders)	16
Belgium (Ultratop 50 Wallonia)	7
Czech Republic (IFPI)	6
Europe (European Hot 100 Singles)	10
France (SNEP)	3
Germany (GfK)	11
Hungary (Rádiós Top 40)	9
Hungary (Single Top 40)	9
Ireland (IRMA)	39
Italy (FIMI)	20
Netherlands (Dutch Top 40)	3
Netherlands (Single Top 100)	3
New Zealand (Recorded Music NZ)	48
Poland (Polish Airplay Charts)	1
Sweden (Sverigetopplistan)	20
Switzerland (Schweizer Hitparade)	23
UK Singles (Official Charts)	28
UK Airplay (Music Week)	34
US Billboard Hot 100	76
US Adult Contemporary (Billboard)	1

Chart (2020)	Peak position
Poland Airplay (ZPAV)	94

==== Year-end charts ====
Chart (2002)	Position
Netherlands (Dutch Top 40)	98

Chart (2003)	Position
Belgium (Ultratop Flanders)	97
Belgium (Ultratop Wallonia)	42
France (SNEP)	40
Netherlands (Dutch Top 40)	38
Netherlands (Single Top 100)	32
Romania (Romanian Top 100)	17
US Adult Contemporary (Billboard)	2

=== Certifications ===
Region	Certification	Certified units/sales
Belgium (BRMA)	Gold	25,000^{*}
France (SNEP)	Gold	250,000^{*}
^{*} Sales figures based on certification alone.

=== Personnel ===
- Phil Collins – vocals, drums, percussion
- Jamie Muhoberac – keyboards
- Daryl Stuermer – lead guitar
- Tim Pierce – rhythm guitar
- Paul Bushnell – bass guitar

== See also ==
- List of Billboard Adult Contemporary number ones of 2002
