= The Show Must Go On (Leo Sayer song) =

1973 single by Leo Sayer

- German vinyl single

Single by Leo Sayer

from the album Silverbird
- B-side: "Tomorrow"
- Released: 1973
- Recorded: 1973
- Genre: Rock
- Length: 3:30; 2:53 (7" version)
- Label: Chrysalis
- Songwriters: Leo Sayer; David Courtney
- Producers: Adam Faith; David Courtney

Leo Sayer singles chronology
"Why Is Everybody Going Home" (1973)	"The Show Must Go On" (1973)	"One Man Band" (1974)

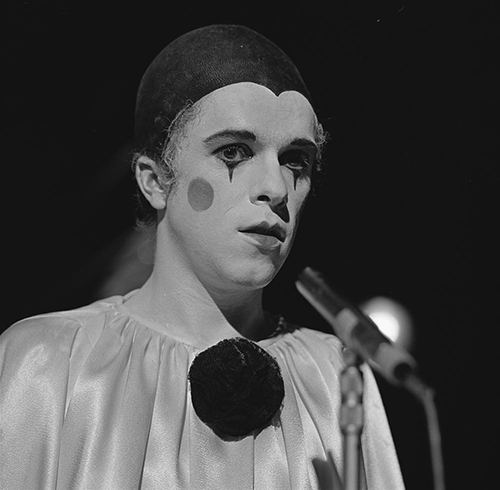
Sayer performing the song on Dutch television (AVRO's TopPop) in 1974

"The Show Must Go On"
- Dutch vinyl single

Single by Three Dog Night

from the album Hard Labor
- B-side: "On the Way Back Home"
- Released: 16 March, 1974
- Genre: Rock
- Length: 4:23 (album version); 3:37 (single version)
- Label: Dunhill
- Songwriters: Leo Sayer; David Courtney; Danny Hutton; Chuck Negron; Cory Wells; Jimmy Greenspoon; Jack Ryland; Skip Konte; Mickey McMeel; James Smith
- Producer: Jimmy Ienner

Three Dog Night singles chronology
"Let Me Serenade You" (1973)	"The Show Must Go On" (1974)	"Sure As I'm Sittin' Here" (19)

"The Show Must Go On" (also known as "Must Let The Show Go On") is a song co-written by Leo Sayer and David Courtney and first recorded by Sayer. It was released in the United Kingdom in 1973, becoming Sayer's first hit record (reaching its chart peak of number 2 in early 1974 in the UK). The song reached number 3 on the Irish Singles Chart in January 1974, and was included on Sayer's debut album Silverbird.

The song was covered by Three Dog Night, whose version was released in 1974, becoming a hit in the United States, peaking at number 4 on the Billboard Hot 100 and sung by vocalist Chuck Negron. The record reached number one on the Cashbox pop chart, number 2 on the Canadian RPM Magazine charts, and became their seventh and final gold record.

It uses a circus theme as a metaphor for dealing with the difficulties and wrong choices of life. Early in Sayer's career, he performed it dressed and made up as a pierrot clown. Like the album version on Sayer's debut album, Three Dog Night's version also quotes Julius Fučík's "Entrance of the Gladiators" which is commonly associated with circus clowns.

In Sayer's version, the last line of the chorus is "I won't let the show go on". Three Dog Night changed this line to "I must let the show go on", which Sayer has criticized.

== Personnel ==
- Leo Sayer - vocals
- Russ Ballard - banjo
- David Courtney – piano
- Robert Henrit - drums
- Dave Wintour - bass

== Chart performance ==
=== Leo Sayer version ===
Weekly chart (1974)	Peak position
Australia (Kent Music Report)	10
Ireland	3
South Africa (Springbok Radio)	11
UK Singles Chart	2

Year-end chart (1974)	Rank
Australia (Kent Music Report)	76

=== Three Dog Night version ===
Three Dog Night's cover of "The Show Must Go On" became their last Top 10 hit in the U.S., where it reached number four on the Billboard Hot 100 and number one on the Cash Box Top 100, as well as in Canada, where it reached number two. It also reached number 11 in the Netherlands and number 12 in Germany.

Record World said that "3DN's treatment of this Leo Sayer English smash is a superb example of their interpretive power."

Several AM radio edits have shortened the instrumental introduction, due to time constraints and limitations.

=== Weekly charts ===
Chart (1974)	Peak position
Argentina (Cash Box)	2
Belgium (Ultratop 50 Flanders)	23
Canada Top Singles (RPM)	2
Germany (GfK)	12
Netherlands (Dutch Top 40)	7
Netherlands (Single Top 100)	6
New Zealand (Listener)	9
US Billboard Hot 100	4
US Cash Box	1

=== Year-end charts ===
Chart (1974)	Rank
US Billboard Hot 100	42
US Cash Box	63
Canada	43
Netherlands	71

=== Certifications ===
Region	Certification	Certified units/sales
United States (RIAA)	Gold	1,000,000^{^}
^{^} Shipments figures based on certification alone.

=== Pasadena Roof Orchestra version ===
The Pasadena Roof Orchestra's 1977 album "The Show Must Go On" takes its name from the track, and (in an unusual departure into contemporary music) features their cover version of the song; it was re-released as part of their Jubilee Collection CDs in 2018.

== Bibliography ==
- Gogan, Larry (1987). The Larry Gogan Book of Irish Chart Hits (Maxwell Publications) ISBN 9781870846004
- Whitburn, Joel (1996). The Billboard Book of Top 40 Hits, 6th Edition (Billboard Publications), ISBN 978-0823076321
