= Frank Farrell (musician) =

English rock bassist (1947–1997)

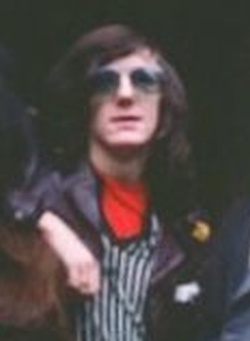
- Farrell outside Hotel Hirschen, Zurich in 1969

Background information
- Born: Francis Anthony Farrell; 31 March 1947; Birmingham, England
- Died: 19 July 1997 (aged 50) London, England
- Genres: Pop, pop rock, disco
- Occupations: Singer-songwriter, musician
- Instruments: Bass guitar, guitar, piano, accordion, harmonica, backing vocals
- Years active: 1963–1997
- Labels: Mercury Records (UK); A&M; Chrysalis Records (UK)

Francis Anthony Farrell (31 March 1947 – 19 July 1997) was an English rock bassist, vocalist, and songwriter. Over a professional career that spanned thirty years he is best known as the bassist of English rock band Supertramp and for his musical association with Leo Sayer. Farrell co-wrote the song "Rosie Had Everything Planned" with Roger Hodgson while with Supertramp and a number of songs with Sayer including the worldwide chart hit "Moonlighting".

== Early life and education ==
Francis Anthony Farrell was born in Birmingham, England on 31 March 1947. He attended St. Philip's Grammar School in Hagley Road, Edgbaston from 1959 to 1963.

== Early days ==
His first public appearances were with the Birmingham-based 1960s beat band "The Silverlinks" that he joined with his best friend and school mate Robert Shorter, who played drums, in 1964. He then went on to play bass and provide backing vocals in the Ray King Soul Band that toured widely in the West Midlands.

In 1968 he was recruited by Birmingham psychedelic rock band "Breakthru" at the same time as drummer Richard "Plug" Thomas. Breakthru went on to become one of the more successful Birmingham-based rock bands of the period, playing several high-profile festivals including the "Festival of Flower Children" at Woburn Abbey on a bill with The Jimi Hendrix Experience, the Bee Gees, Eric Burdon and the Small Faces. Breakthru also featured at the National Jazz and Blues Festivals in 1967 and 1968.

The band was signed to Mercury Records in early 1968 and released an unsuccessful single "Ice Cream Tree" b/w "Julius Caesar". The follow-up single, a rock adaption written by Farrell and loosely based on the Peer Gynt "Hall of the Mountain King Overture", was never released but the twenty-minute-long stage version of the number would become a centerpiece of the band's show.

Breakthru then undertook an extensive tour of Germany and Switzerland in the second half of 1969, only returning to the UK in December of that year. The band split on their return with Farrell and vocalist, Gary Aflalo, moving to London. Aflalo joined the original London cast of Hair and Farrell became head road manager for American singing act Johnny Johnson and the Bandwagon during their seven-month tour of the UK.

== Supertramp years ==
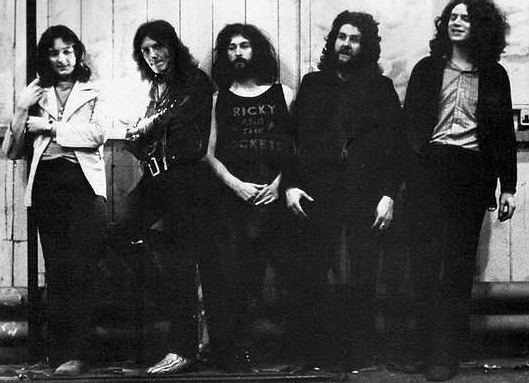
Farrell with Supertramp, standing second from left next to Roger Hodgson

When the Bandwagon tour came to an end in early 1970 Farrell returned to bass playing. In April 1971, he started rehearsing with the then largely unknown Supertramp. Having released their first album on the A&M (UK division)'s label to little success the band was preparing material for their forthcoming Indelibly Stamped.

Having already written several songs during the Breakthru years, Farrell wrote the song "Rosie Had Everything Planned" in conjunction with Roger Hodgson and the song was eventually included on Indelibly Stamped, with Farrell playing bass, piano and accordion during the recording sessions. Farrell played and toured with Supertramp for over a year, leaving in February 1972. Following his departure from Supertramp, Farrell joined the British progressive rock band Fields, replacing departed bassist-vocalist Alan Barry. The new lineup recorded Contrasts: Urban Roar to Country Peace which would have been Fields' sophomore album for CBS due for 1972 release, but the record was shelved effectively ending the band. The recording finally saw its first-ever release in 2015.

In October 2007, and again in 2013, former Supertramp guitarist, singer and songwriter Roger Hodgson paid tribute to Farrell by performing "Rosie Had Everything Planned" to a packed house at Birmingham Symphony Hall. Hodgson remarked before the concert "Frank is no longer with us but I'd like to perform the Supertramp song I wrote with him, "Rosie Had Everything Planned", when I play the Symphony Hall. As he was from Birmingham it would be a nice link and I will actually announce that I was doing it as a tribute to his memory."

== Later work ==
In the late spring 1973 Farrell became the inaugural musical director of the first Rocky Horror Show and moved to playing piano in the house band. However, shortly after the show's premier, at the Royal Court Theatre Upstairs in June 1973, Farrell resigned after a falling out with the show's writer Richard O'Brien over the musical style.

== Leo Sayer ==
Farrell was spotted by Leo Sayer and recruited to fill the bass slot in the band Sayer was forming to tour the UK, Europe and the US. During the UK leg keyboardist Dave Greenslade left the band at short notice to work on Greenslade's new album Spyglass Guest, and Farrell switched to keyboards for the remainder of the tour, returning to the bass when the band toured the US.

Between Autumn 1974 and early 1975 Farrell and Sayer co-wrote a large number of songs together, ten of which would feature on the album Another Year and one song "Moonlighting" that would reach number 2 on the UK singles chart in August 1975, later becoming a hit in most territories worldwide.

== Death ==
After his close association with Leo Sayer ended, Farrell continued to be involved in the music industry, writing songs, recording and playing as a session musician for TV shows and tours behind major artists, including spells with American guitarists Joe Jammer and Tim Buckley.

Farrell had struggled with a moderately heavy drinking habit throughout most of his adult life. He was 50 years old when he died.
