= Giving It All Away =

Single by Roger Daltrey

from the album Daltrey
- Released: April 1973
- Recorded: January–February 1973
- Genre: Soft rock
- Length: 3:26
- Label: MCA (US); Track (UK)
- Songwriters: Leo Sayer; David Courtney
- Producers: David Courtney; Adam Faith

Roger Daltrey singles chronology
| "Giving It All Away" (1973) | "Thinking" (1973) |

Official audio
- "Giving It All Away" on YouTube

"Giving It All Away" is the debut solo single by the English rock singer Roger Daltrey, the lead vocalist of the Who. The song was written by the then-unknown Leo Sayer with David Courtney. Adam Faith and David Courtney produced the track.

The song was the first single from his debut solo studio album Daltrey (1973). It peaked at No. 5 in the UK singles chart but failed to chart in the US. Daltrey would never beat this chart position in the UK throughout his solo career.

Daltrey performed the song on The Old Grey Whistle Test in 1973.

Sayer later recorded his own version of the song for his second studio album Just a Boy (1974), along with another track from Daltrey, "One Man Band".

Daltrey re-introduced the song into his setlist for his 2022 UK solo tour.

== Critical reception ==
Record World called it "a moving tune with a sensitive arrangement and production in support."
