= Living in a Fantasy =

Studio album by Leo Sayer
- Released: 22 August 1980
- Recorded: 1979–1980
- Genre: Soft rock
- Length: 38:51
- Labels: Chrysalis (UK); Warner Bros. (USA)
- Producer: Alan Tarney

Leo Sayer chronology
| Here (1979) | Living in a Fantasy (1980) | World Radio (1982) |

Professional ratings
Review scores
| Source | Rating |
|---|---|
| AllMusic | 3/5 stars |
| Smash Hits | 6/10 |

Living in a Fantasy is the eighth album by the English singer-songwriter Leo Sayer. It was released on 22 August 1980.

Although the album was not a huge commercial success, the single that it spawned, a cover version of Bobby Vee's "More Than I Can Say", spent five weeks at No. 2 on the Billboard Hot 100 chart in December 1980 and January 1981. Sayer's version of the song was certified a gold record by the RIAA. It also spent three weeks at No. 1 on the Billboard adult contemporary chart. In the UK, the song peaked at No. 2 on the UK Singles Chart, while it spent two weeks atop the Kent Music Report in Australia. Sayer has stated that while looking for an "oldie" to record for Living in a Fantasy, he saw a TV commercial for a greatest hits compilation album by Vee, and chose the song on the spot: "We went into a record store that afternoon, bought the record and had the song recorded that night."

AllMusic noted that Living in a Fantasy was "the last album to yield hits for Leo Sayer in America..."

== Track listing ==
All tracks written by Leo Sayer and Alan Tarney, except where noted.

=== Side one ===
1. "Time Ran Out on You" (Tarney) – 3:50
2. "Where Did We Go Wrong" – 3:55
3. "You Win, I Lose" – 3:43
4. "More Than I Can Say" (Jerry Allison, Sonny Curtis) – 3:41
5. "Millionaire" – 4:22

=== Side two ===
1. "Once in a While" (Tarney) – 3:30
2. "Living in a Fantasy" – 4:25
3. "She's Not Coming Back" – 3:50
4. "Let Me Know" (Tarney) – 3:55
5. "Only Foolin'" – 3:40

== Personnel ==
- Leo Sayer – guitar, harmonica, vocals
- Nick Glennie-Smith – keyboard
- Trevor Spencer – drums
- Alan Tarney – bass guitar, guitar, keyboards, vocals

== Production ==
- Record producer: Alan Tarney
- Mixing: Ashley Howe, Assistant: David Kemp
- Mastering: John Dent
- Art direction: Peter Wagg

== Charts ==
| Chart (1980–1981) | Peak position |
|---|---|
| Australia (Kent Music Report) | 12 |
| UK Albums Chart | 15 |
| US Albums Chart | 36 |
