= Moonlighting (Leo Sayer song) =

1975 single by Leo Sayer

- Cover of the single released in the Netherlands

Single by Leo Sayer

from the album Another Year
- B-side: "Streets of Your Town"
- Released: 22 August 1975
- Genre: Pop rock
- Length: 3:59
- Label: Chrysalis
- Songwriters: Leo Sayer; Frank Farrell
- Producers: Adam Faith; Russ Ballard

Leo Sayer singles chronology
"Train" (1975)	"Moonlighting" (1975)	"I Will Not Stop Fighting" (1975)

"Moonlighting" is a song by Leo Sayer released on 22 August 1975 as the first single from his third studio album Another Year. It became his fourth top-ten hit, peaking at number 2 on the UK singles chart and was certified silver by the British Phonographic Industry.

== Lyrics ==
"Moonlighting" was written by Sayer and Frank Farrell and was co-produced by Sayer's manager Adam Faith and Russ Ballard.

It was inspired by a roadie with Sayer who fell in love with the daughter of a chief constable in the late 1960s. The chief was not pleased about this and would not agree for them to get married, so the couple decided to run off and elope to Gretna Green in Scotland, where this would be possible. However, they never made it to Gretna Green, as they were stopped by Carlisle police who had been made aware by Worthing police of the couple's intentions. For the song, Sayer wanted the story to end happily, represented with the lyrics "we're only ten miles to Gretna, they're three hundred behind".

== Charts ==
=== Weekly charts ===
Chart (1975)	Peak position
Australia (Kent Music Report)	13
Ireland (IRMA)	1
New Zealand (Recorded Music NZ)	14
Norway (VG-lista)	6
Rhodesia (Lyons Maid)	3
Sweden (Sverigetopplistan)	7
South Africa (Springbok Radio)	12
UK Singles (OCC)	2

=== Year-end charts ===
Chart (1975)	Peak position
Australia (Kent Music Report)	66

== Certifications ==
Region	Certification	Certified units/sales
United Kingdom (BPI)	Silver	250,000^{^}
^{^} Shipments figures based on certification alone.
