= One Man Band (Roger Daltrey song) =

Single by Roger Daltrey

from the album Daltrey
- Released: January 1974
- Genre: Rock; soft rock
- Length: 3:54
- Label: MCA (US); Track (UK)
- Songwriters: David Courtney; Leo Sayer
- Producers: David Courtney; Adam Faith

Roger Daltrey singles chronology
"It's a Hard Life" (1973)	"One Man Band" (1974)	"(Come and) Get Your Love" (1975)

Audio
- "One Man Band" on YouTube

"One Man Band" is a song recorded by the Who's lead vocalist Roger Daltrey, from his debut solo studio album Daltrey (1973). The song was written by David Courtney and Leo Sayer, and featured Daltrey's acoustic guitar strumming. According to Daltrey, it "reminiscences of Shepherd's Bush" (a suburb of West London where Daltrey had grown up and the Who were formed) and became one of the highlights of the album, and was later released as a single in its own right in some European territories.

The song was recorded by Leo Sayer a year later on his second studio album Just a Boy, and released as a single, which became one of Sayer's biggest hits, peaking at No. 6 in the UK singles chart, and placing in the top 10 in South Africa.
