= Thunder in My Heart (song) =

1977 single by Leo Sayer

Single by Leo Sayer

from the album Thunder in My Heart
- B-side: "Get the Girl"
- Released: 19 August 1977
- Studio: Studio 55, Los Angeles, California
- Genre: Disco
- Length: 3:35
- Label: Warner; Chrysalis
- Songwriters: Leo Sayer; Tom Snow
- Producer: Richard Perry

Leo Sayer singles chronology
"How Much Love" (1977)	"Thunder in My Heart" (1977)	"Easy to Love" (1977)

Music video
- "Thunder in My Heart" on YouTube

"Thunder in My Heart" is a song by English-Australian singer Leo Sayer, from his fifth studio album, Thunder in My Heart (1977). The song was written by Sayer and Tom Snow, while produced by Richard Perry. It was released through Warner and Chrysalis Records in 1977, as the first single from the album. The disco song consists of a bassline and strings. "Thunder in My Heart" received generally positive reviews from music critics, who praised the production. It peaked at number 22 on the UK Singles Chart and at number 38 on the US Billboard Hot 100. A dance remix of the song by British disc jockey Meck titled "Thunder in My Heart Again" was released on 6 February 2006, and topped the UK Singles Chart.

== Composition ==
Musically, "Thunder in My Heart" is a disco song. It contains a bassline performed by Abraham Laboriel on the bass guitar, accompanied with strings and vocals. Sayer and Tom Snow wrote the song, which was produced by Richard Perry. Snow plays the piano, with drums and congas performed by Jeff Porcaro and Lenny Castro respectively. Fred Tackett and Lee Ritenour uses the guitars, as Bobbye Hall utilises a tambourine.

== Critical reception ==
Writing for the Red Deer Advocate, J. Norman Bower stated that "Thunder in My Heart" is a "classic Sayer melody" followed with instrumentals, while Warren Gerds of the Green Bay Press-Gazette opined that the song has a "big sound" due to the production.

== Commercial performance ==
In Australia, "Thunder in My Heart" peaked at number 11 on the Kent Music Report, where it was ranked at the number 93 position on the 1977 year-end chart. The song debuted at number 32 on the New Zealand Singles Chart dated 11 December 1977. It peaked at number 21 on the chart issued 29 January 1978, and remained for four weeks. "Thunder in My Heart" bowed at number 22 on the UK Singles Chart dated 2 October 1977, where it remained for eight weeks. The song peaked at number 38 on the US Billboard Hot 100 chart issued 5 November 1977. On the Canadian RPM Top 100 Singles chart issued 19 November 1977, "Thunder in My Heart" charted at number 35.

== Credits and personnel ==
Credits adapted from the liner notes of Thunder in My Heart.

Recording

- Recorded at Studio 55 (Los Angeles, California)

Personnel

- Leo Sayer – vocals, songwriting
- Tom Snow – songwriting, piano
- Richard Perry – producer
- Jeff Porcaro – drums
- Abraham Laboriel – bass
- Fred Tackett – guitar
- Lee Ritenour – guitar
- Lenny Castro – congas
- Bobbye Hall – tambourine
- Gene Page – string arrangements, conductor
- Howard Steele – recording, remix engineer
- Helen Silvani – second engineer
- Allen Zentz – mastering

== Charts ==
=== Weekly charts ===
Weekly chart performance for "Thunder in My Heart"
Chart (1977–1978)	Peak position
Australia (Kent Music Report)	11
Austria (Ö3 Austria Top 40)	17
Belgium (Ultratop 50 Flanders)	11
Canada Top Singles (RPM)	35
Finland (Suomen virallinen lista)	22
Netherlands (Dutch Top 40)	11
Netherlands (Single Top 100)	12
New Zealand (Recorded Music NZ)	21
UK Singles (Official Charts)	22
US Billboard Hot 100	38

=== Year-end charts ===
Year-end chart performance for "Thunder in My Heart" in 1977
Chart (1977)	Position
Australia (Kent Music Report)	93
Belgium (Ultratop)	91

== "Thunder in My Heart Again" ==
"Thunder in My Heart Again"

Single by Meck featuring Leo Sayer
- Released: 6 February 2006
- Genre: Dance
- Length: 3:07
- Label: Apollo; free2air; Island
- Songwriters: Leo Sayer; Tom Snow
- Producer: Meck

Meck singles chronology
"Thunder in My Heart Again" (2006)	"Feels Like Home" (2007)

=== Background and release ===
A remix of "Thunder in My Heart" by British disc jockey Meck titled "Thunder in My Heart Again" was released on 6 February 2006, which featured Sayer's vocals. In 2005, Meck asked Sayer for permission to remix the song, after the former found it as a 12-inch single inside a Los Angeles discount store and envisioned a "dance mix treatment". Sayer opined that Meck completely altered the sound but "kept all of its integrity", concluding that he could not discover anything wrong with Meck's version.

"Thunder in My Heart Again" is a dance song, which contains a sample of "Thunder in My Heart" by Leo Sayer. It was performed, produced and arranged by Meck, with mixing by Peter Craigie.

=== Commercial performance ===
"Thunder in My Heart Again" debuted at the number one peak on the UK Singles Chart dated 12 February 2006, 28 years after "Thunder in My Heart" originally charted on the same chart. It was Meck's first single on the chart to debut at the number one position dated 18 February 2006, and was Sayer's second number one song on the chart at the age of 57 years, 8 months. It was eventually certified silver by the British Phonographic Industry (BPI) on 22 July 2013, for selling 200,000 equivalent units. The song also debuted at the peak of the Scottish Singles Chart dated 12 February 2006. "Thunder in My Heart Again" peaked at number 16 on the Australian ARIA Singles Chart, where it remained for 17 weeks.

=== Credits and personnel ===
Credits adapted from the back cover of "Thunder in My Heart Again".

Recording

- Features a sample from and is an adaptation of "Thunder in My Heart" by Leo Sayer.

Personnel

- Meck – performer, producer, arrangement
- Peter Craigie – mixing

=== Track listings ===
UK CD single
No.	Title	Length
1.	"Thunder in My Heart Again" (Radio Edit)	3:07
2.	"Thunder in My Heart Again" (Miami Calling CD Mix)	5:45

UK maxi single
No.	Title	Length
1.	"Thunder in My Heart Again" (Radio Edit)	3:07
2.	"Thunder in My Heart Again" (Miami Calling Mix)	7:59
3.	"Thunder in My Heart Again" (Hott 22 Mix)	7:25
4.	"Thunder in My Heart Again" (Hott 22 Dub)	7:34
5.	"Thunder in My Heart Again" (Starlet DJs Groove Deluxe Mix)	6:48
6.	"Thunder in My Heart Again" (Starlet DJs Dub)	6:13

Australian maxi single
No.	Title	Length
1.	"Thunder in My Heart Again" (Radio Edit)	3:07
2.	"Thunder in My Heart Again" (Miami Calling Mix)	7:59
3.	"Thunder in My Heart Again" (Hott 22 Mix)	7:25
4.	"Thunder in My Heart Again" (Starlet DJs Groove Deluxe Mix)	6:48

=== Charts ===
==== Weekly charts ====
Weekly chart performance for "Thunder in My Heart Again"
Chart (2006)	Peak position
Australia (ARIA)	16
Australian Dance (ARIA)	3
Austria (Ö3 Austria Top 40)	55
Belgium (Ultratop 50 Flanders)	6
Belgium (Ultratip Bubbling Under Wallonia)	4
Belgium Dance (Ultratop Flanders)	2
CIS Airplay (TopHit)	9
Europe (Eurochart Hot 100)	6
Finland (Suomen virallinen lista)	11
France (SNEP)	75
Germany (GfK)	46
Hungary (Editors' Choice Top 40)	11
Ireland (IRMA)	14
Ireland Dance (IRMA)	2
Italy (FIMI)	11
Netherlands (Dutch Top 40)	4
Netherlands (Single Top 100)	11
Russia Airplay (TopHit)	8
Scottish Singles Sales (Official Charts)	1
Switzerland (Schweizer Hitparade)	78
UK Singles (Official Charts)	1
UK Dance (Official Charts)	3
Ukraine Airplay (TopHit)	39

==== Year-end charts ====
Year-end chart performance for "Thunder in My Heart Again" in 2006
Chart (2006)	Position
Australia (ARIA)	82
Australian Dance (ARIA)	9
Belgium (Ultratop 50 Flanders)	28
CIS Airplay (TopHit)	42
Europe (Eurochart Hot 100)	76
Netherlands (Dutch Top 40)	14
Netherlands (Single Top 100)	36
Russia Airplay (TopHit)	39
UK Singles (OCC)	22

=== Certifications ===
Certifications and sales for "Thunder in My Heart Again"
Region	Certification	Certified units/sales
United Kingdom (BPI)	Silver	200,000^{^}
^{^} Shipments figures based on certification alone.

=== Release history ===
Release dates and formats for "Thunder in My Heart Again"
Region	Date	Format(s)	Label(s)	Ref.
United Kingdom	6 February 2006	12-inch single; CD single	Apollo; free2air; Island	
Australia	27 March 2006	CD single	Sony BMG	
