= David Courtney =

British singer and songwriter

- Born: David Alexander Cohen; 18 December 1949 (age 76); Brighton, East Sussex, England
- Occupations: Singer; songwriter; record producer
- Instrument: Vocals
- Years active: 1965–present
- Labels: United Artists; The White Room; Yellow & White; Angel Air
- Website: Official website

David Courtney (born David Alexander Cohen; 18 December 1949) is a British singer, songwriter and record producer. Courtney's first big break was as a songwriter with Adam Faith and Leo Sayer; Courtney co-wrote several hit songs with them (including "Giving It All Away", recorded by both Sayer and Roger Daltrey) and he co-produced Faith's 1974 album, I Survive. He released one album of his own on United Artists in 1974 entitled David Courtney's First Day which had some success on both sides of the Atlantic, and peaked at No. 194 on the US Billboard 200.

Courtney did not release any further material until 2005, when some of his unreleased material, including a 1980 studio album, was released on indie label The White Room. As a producer, Courtney has also worked with musicians such as Roger Daltrey, Gene Pitney, Eric Clapton, David Gilmour and Jimmy Page. In September 2015, Courtney celebrated his 50th anniversary in music with the release of his Anthology album on Angel Air Records.

In 2002, Courtney was responsible for introducing the first Walk of Fame cultural attraction in the UK, located in Brighton. In September 2015 Courtney joined forces with the National Football Museum and sports artist Paul Trevillion to announce the world's first Football Walk of Fame, which would be launched in Cathedral Square, Manchester.

Courtney was awarded Russia's Tsarskoselskaya Artistic Premium of 2016, as a composer and producer of the 2016 album Matinee, a collaboration between Courtney and the Russian singer Marina Kapuro. Courtney is the first British composer to receive the award.

== Discography ==
- David Courtney's First Day (United Artists, 1974)
- Shooting Star (The White Room, 2005)
- Midsummer Madness (White Room, 2005)
- Here's One I Made Earlier (White Room, 2006)
- The Show Must Go On (Yellow & White, 2010)
- The Truth Behind the Music 'audiobiography' (The White Room, 2011)
