= Leo Sayer =

British singer (born 1948)

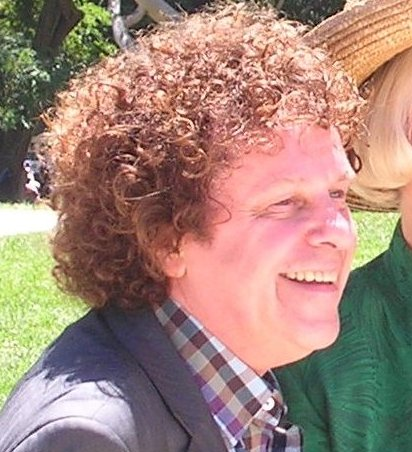
- Sayer at an Australia Day ceremony in Canberra, 2009

Background information
- Born: Gerard Hugh Sayer; May 21, 1948 (age 78); Shoreham-by-Sea, Sussex, England
- Genres: Soft rock; disco; blue-eyed soul
- Occupations: Singer; songwriter
- Instrument: Vocals
- Years active: 1963–present
- Labels: Chrysalis (UK); Warner Bros.; Rhino (US); Universal (AUS)
- Website: www.leosayer.com

Gerard Hugh Sayer (born 21 May 1948), known by his stage name Leo Sayer, is an English singer and songwriter who has been active since the early 1970s. He is best known for his 1978 Grammy Award-winning song "You Make Me Feel Like Dancing". He has been an Australian citizen since 2009 and lives in New South Wales.

Sayer launched his career in the United Kingdom in the early 1970s and became a top singles and album act, on both sides of the Atlantic in that decade. His first seven UK hit singles reached the top 10 – a feat first accomplished by his early-career manager, Adam Faith. His songs have been sung by other notable artists, including Cliff Richard, Roger Daltrey, and Three Dog Night.

== Early life and education ==
Gerard Hugh Sayer was born on 21 May 1948 to Thomas E. G. Sayer and Theresa (née Nolan) in Shoreham-by-Sea, Sussex, England, and grew up there. He is the second of their three sons. His father was English and his mother was born in Maguiresbridge, Northern Ireland. He spent holidays on her father's small farm at Edenmore, a townland near the hamlet of Killesher; both Edenmore and Maguiresbridge are in County Fermanagh.

Sayer attended St Peter's Catholic Primary School in Shoreham-by-Sea and then Blessed Robert Southwell (now St Oscar Romero Catholic School) in Goring-by-Sea. He studied commercial art and graphic design at West Sussex College of Art and Design in Worthing, Sussex.

Sayer was discovered by musician David Courtney from Brighton, who then co-managed and co-produced him, with former pop singer Adam Faith. In January 1967 at the age of 18, while working as a hall porter at the King's Hotel in Hove, East Sussex, Sayer assisted in rescuing elderly guests from a serious fire, which damaged the hotel's first floor. He was rescued himself from the blazing hotel by builders working on a block of flats beside the hotel.

== Career ==
=== Beginnings: 1970s ===
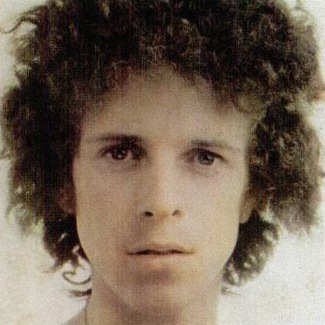
Promotional shoot of Sayer in the Silverbird era, 1974

Sayer began his music career co-writing songs with David Courtney, including "Giving It All Away", which gave Roger Daltrey of the Who his first solo hit in 1973. All but two of the songs on the album, Daltrey, were co-written by Sayer and Courtney. Also in 1973, Sayer began his career as a recording artist, under the management of Adam Faith, who signed Sayer to the Chrysalis label, in the United Kingdom and Warner Bros. Records, in the United States.

His debut single, "Why Is Everybody Going Home", failed to chart. He achieved national prominence in the UK with his second single, the music hall-styled song, "The Show Must Go On". Sayer performed the song on British television, wearing a pierrot costume and makeup. The single went to number two on the UK singles chart. That was matched by his debut album, Silverbird, on the UK albums chart, co-written with David Courtney, who also co-produced the album with Adam Faith. Three Dog Night's cover of "The Show Must Go On", which was the group's last Billboard Hot 100 top 10 record, reached number four on 25 May 1974. Sayer's subsequent singles were all major hits in the UK – "One Man Band" went to number six in 1974, "Long Tall Glasses (I Can Dance)" (UK number four, 1974) became his first top-10 hit in the US, reaching number 9, and "Moonlighting" went to No. 2 in the UK in 1975. In 1976, Sayer recorded three songs by the Beatles, "I Am the Walrus", "Let It Be", and "The Long and Winding Road", for the Beatles-themed concept film All This and World War II. His albums during the period were consistently successful in the UK: he scored five consecutive top-10 placings on the UK albums chart between 1973 and 1977.

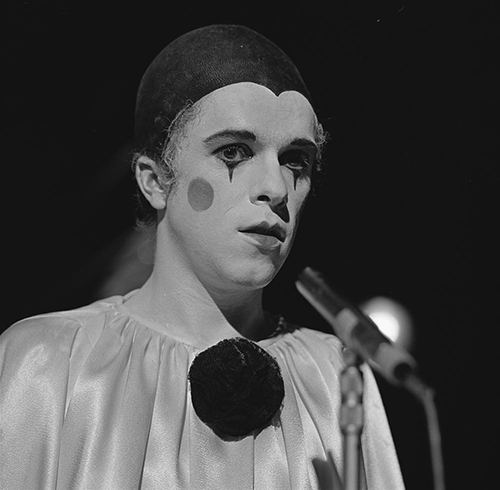
Sayer performing on TopPop in 1974

Sayer also garnered success as an album artist in the US, beginning with his second LP Just a Boy (1974), which reached number 16. His fourth album, Endless Flight (1976), consolidated his international popularity, reaching number four in the UK and number 10 in the US; it charted strongly in other countries, including Sweden, Norway, the Netherlands, and New Zealand. It was certified as a platinum album in the UK and the U.S., and double-platinum in Canada.

=== Career peak: late 1970s–1980 ===
The peak of his career came in 1977, when he achieved two consecutive number-one hits in the US, first with the disco-styled "You Make Me Feel Like Dancing" (a Grammy Award winner for the year's best rhythm and blues song), followed by a romantic ballad, "When I Need You" (1977), which reached number one in both the UK and U.S. Written by Albert Hammond and Carole Bayer Sager, it was Sayer's first number-one single in the UK (after three number-two hits). It was also the first of two chart-toppers in a row in the UK for producer Richard Perry. Also from Endless Flight, Sayer covered the Danny O'Keefe song "Magdalena", which served as the B-side to the "You Make Me Feel Like Dancing" single.

In 1979, the compilation album The Very Best of Leo Sayer (originally released by Chrysalis in the UK and elsewhere, with its first release in the US in 2000 by Rhino Records with different cover art) became Sayer's first UK number-one album and his seventh consecutive UK Top 20 album. Sayer also guest-starred in the second episode of the third season of The Muppet Show, and performed "You Make Me Feel Like Dancing", "The Show Must Go On", and "When I Need You".

Sayer recorded cover versions of Bobby Vee's Sonny Curtis-Jerry Allison composition "More Than I Can Say" (his fourth UK No. 2 hit and US No. 2), and Buddy Holly's "Raining in My Heart" (1979) and Bee Gees' "Heart (Stop Beating in Time)" in 1982. In the US, three of his singles – "You Make Me Feel Like Dancing" (1977), "When I Need You" (1977), and "More Than I Can Say" (1980) – were certified gold.

=== The Missing Link (1980–1990) ===
Sayer provided songs for the soundtrack of the French–Belgian animated film The Missing Link (Le Chainon manquant) in 1980. In 1981, he voiced Dan the forest ranger in The Raccoons on Ice, the second of four specials serving as a predecessor to the Canadian animated series The Raccoons. He also sang several songs for the special, which were included on the 1983 album Lake Freeze and the 1984 album The Raccoons: Let's Dance!

In 1990, he contributed to the last studio collaboration between Alan Parsons and Eric Woolfson, Woolfson's solo album Freudiana, performing "I Am a Mirror". Sayer performed at the Sanremo Music Festival in Italy in 1990, with "The Moth and the Flame" (English version of "Tu... sì" by Mango), and in 1991, with "All Alone" (English version of "Dubbi No" by Mietta).

=== Financial difficulties (1990–2006) ===
After a decade of success, Sayer's career experienced repeated setbacks due to a series of financial and legal problems. When Sayer and his first wife, Janice, divorced in 1985, subsequent financial disclosures revealed that Adam Faith had mishandled Sayer's business affairs. Much of the income that Sayer had earned over the previous decade had been lost through Faith's questionable investments and business expenses.

Sayer sued Faith for mismanagement, and the case was eventually settled out of court in 1992, with Sayer receiving a reported payout of £650,000. In the early 1990s, his career stalled again while he fought a protracted but ultimately successful legal battle against his former label, Chrysalis, to regain the publishing rights to his songs. In 1996, he sued his new management after he discovered that his pension fund had allegedly been mismanaged, losing £1 million. Despite spending more than £90,000 in legal fees, the case never made it to court and Sayer abandoned the suit for reasons of cost. He assembled a band led by former Van Morrison guitarist Ronnie Johnson and found his way back to financial security by touring. They recorded the album Live in London which was released in 1999.

=== Later career (2006–2015) ===
On 12 February 2006, Sayer made a return to number one in the UK singles chart, with DJ Meck's remix of "Thunder in My Heart". It was his first appearance in the top 10 in the UK for almost 24 years, and his second chart-topper in the UK, almost three decades after his first. Leo Sayer: At His Very Best, a career-spanning compilation album, was released in the UK on 6 March 2006. It featured the Meck single, alongside "When I Need You" and "You Make Me Feel Like Dancing".

In June 2008, Sayer released a new album only in Australia, Don't Wait Until Tomorrow. The album was produced by Garth Porter (from the Australian pop band Sherbet) and released by Universal Music Australia. It features selections from his catalog rearranged with strings and acoustic and jazz instrumentation.

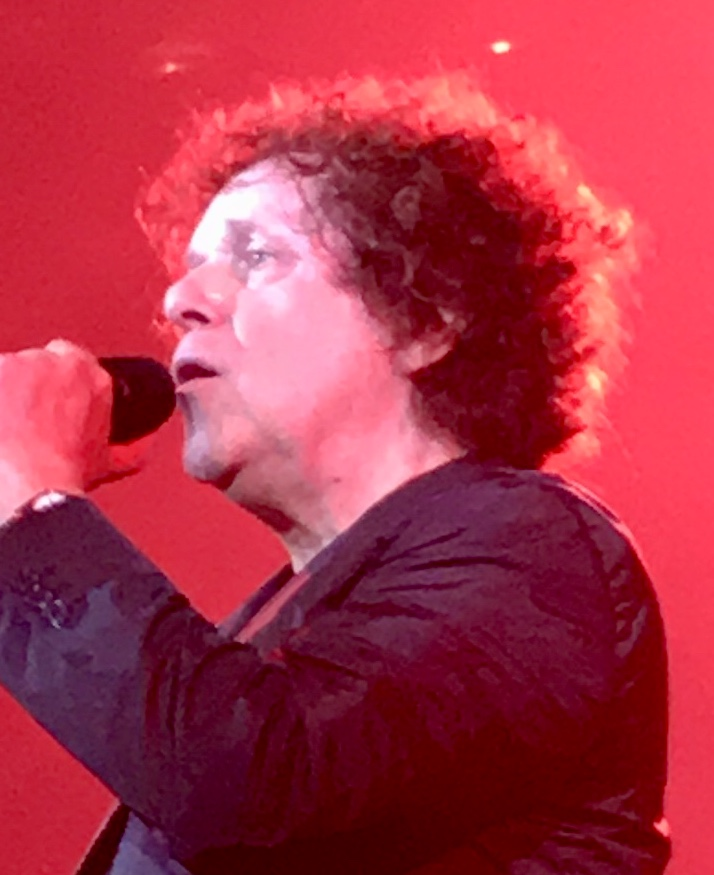
Sayer performing at Union Chapel, Islington, on the Just a Boy at 70 Tour, May 2019

In January 2009, Sayer became an Australian citizen, having lived in Sydney since 2005. He appeared in various television shows in addition to The Muppet Show, including the 1998 Vic and Bob game show Families at War (he performed "When I Need You" while given a piggyback by a contestant running on a treadmill); the Wiggles' 2008 DVD; You Make Me Feel Like Dancing, which featured Sayer's hit of the same name; Celebrity Big Brother UK in 2007; and the Australian television comedy Stupid, Stupid Man.

=== Restless Years and Selfie (2015–present) ===
In January 2015, Sayer released his album Restless Years, and toured Australia and Singapore, with various support acts including Jason Ayres. In the same month, he featured in Singapore's Leo Sayer in Concert – 40 Years at the Top, presented by the British Theatre Playhouse. In October 2015, he was awarded with a Gold Badge of Merit from the British Academy of Songwriters, Composers and Authors. On 3 May 2019, Sayer released an album, Selfie on Demon Records. It was recorded at his home studio at The Barn in Plainland, Queensland.

On 29 November 2024, Sayer released his album 1992, also on Demon Records. It contains a selection of his songs recorded in that year, but until then not released.

== Covers ==
Sayer's songs have been sung by other notable artists, including Cliff Richard, Roger Daltrey, and Three Dog Night.

== Personal life ==
Sayer and his first wife, Janice, married in 1973 and divorced in 1985. He then had a relationship with Donatella Piccinetti and they moved to Australia. They separated briefly in 2007, then reunited and married on 15 April 2023. Sayer lives in the Southern Highlands of New South Wales.

In January 2009, Sayer became an Australian citizen at an Australia Day citizenship ceremony in Canberra. In 2020, he became an ambassador for the Canberra Hospital Foundation.

=== Health problems ===
Sayer has injuries to his legs and ankles, which were caused by a fall off a stage in 1977.

Sayer's family has a history of cancer; both of his parents died of cancer as did other family members on both sides of the family. On his 65th birthday, after experiencing intestinal problems, Sayer had a colonoscopy showing that he had intestinal ulcers and a tumour. He underwent successful surgery and found the tumour was benign.

== Discography ==
- Silverbird (1973)
- Just a Boy (1974)
- Another Year (1975)
- Endless Flight (1976)
- Thunder in My Heart (1977)
- Leo Sayer (1978)
- Here (1979)
- Living in a Fantasy (1980)
- World Radio (1982)
- Have You Ever Been in Love (1983)
- Cool Touch (1990)
- Voice in My Head (2004)
- Don't Wait Until Tomorrow (2008)
- Restless Years (2015)
- Selfie (2019)
- Northern Songs (2022)
- 1992 (2024)
- Return to Paradise (2026)
