= List of Supertramp band members =

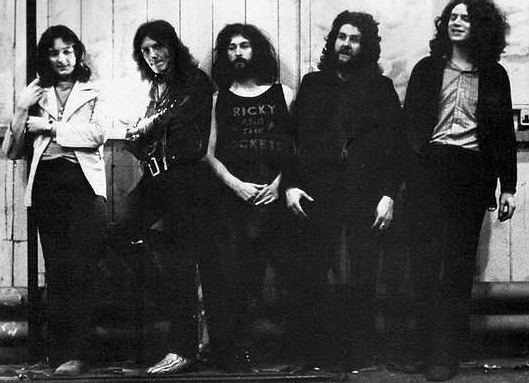
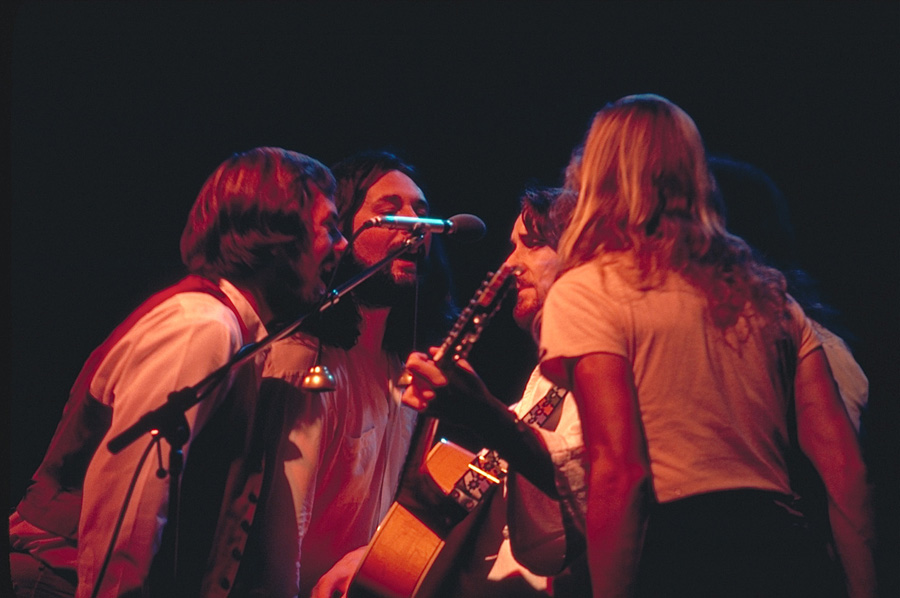
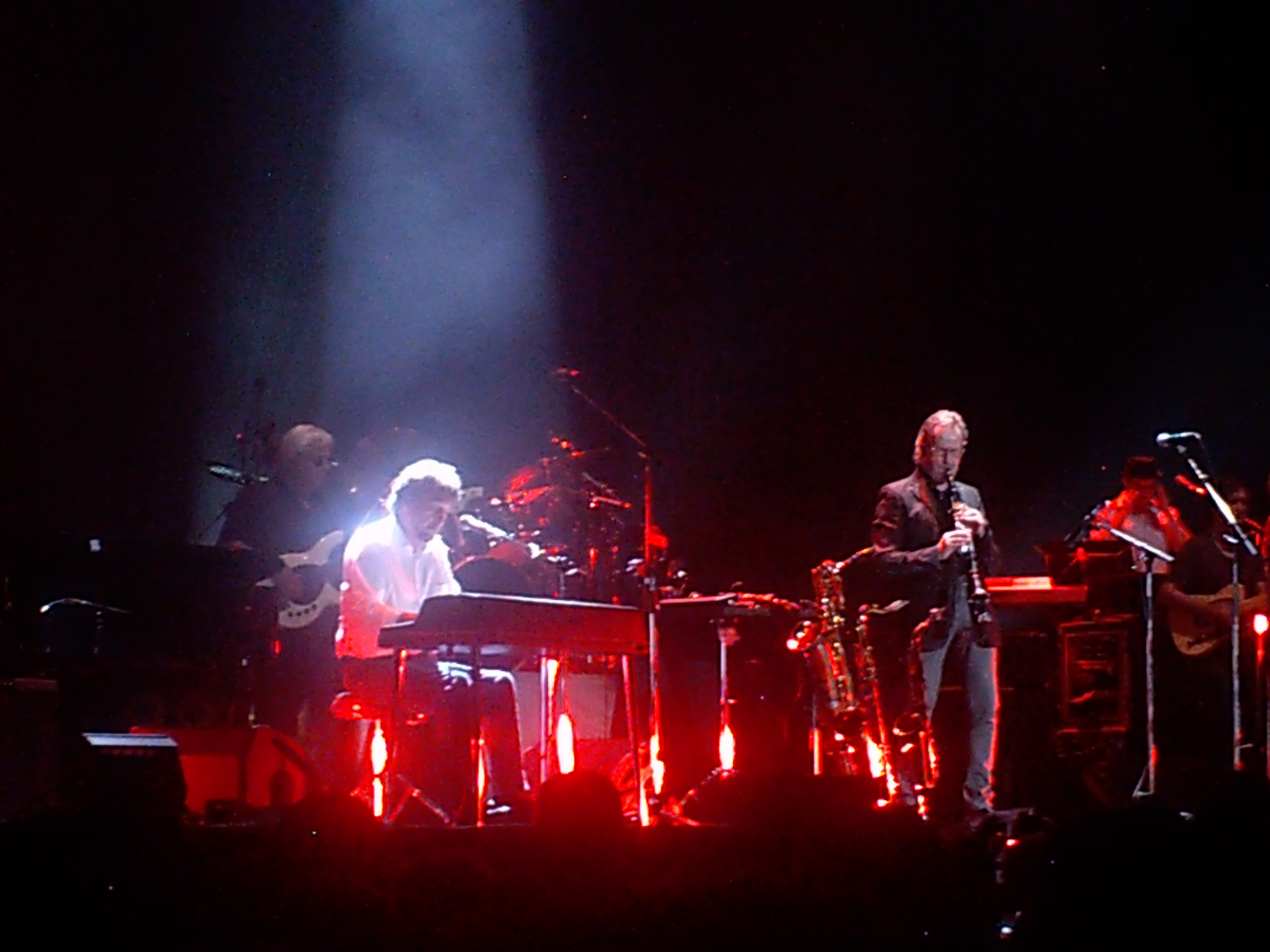
Three lineups of Supertramp in 1971 (top), 1979 (middle) and 2010 (bottom).

Supertramp were an English progressive rock band from London. Formed in 1969, the group originally consisted of bassist and lead vocalist Roger Hodgson, guitarist and vocalist Richard Palmer, keyboardist and vocalist Rick Davies, and drummer Keith Baker. After several changes, their classic lineup formed in 1973 and included Hodgson, Davies, bassist Dougie Thomson, drummer Bob Siebenberg, and saxophonist John Helliwell. Hodgson departed in 1983. After breaking up in 1988 and reforming in 1996, their final touring lineup included Davies, Siebenberg, Helliwell, guitarist Carl Verheyen, trumpeter Lee Thornburg, bassist Cliff Hugo, keyboardist Mark Hart, multi-instrumentalist Jesse Siebenberg, keyboardist Gabe Dixon, and backing vocalist Cassie Miller.

== History ==
=== 1969–1988 ===
Supertramp were formed under the name of Daddy by Roger Hodgson, Richard Palmer, Rick Davies and Keith Baker. Baker was soon replaced by Robert Millar, who performed on the group's self-titled debut album. Shortly after the album's release in July 1970, Dave Winthrop joined on flute and saxophone, while both Palmer and Millar left. Palmer's role was taken over by Hodgson, with Frank Farrell joining on bass and Kevin Currie joining on drums. After the release of their second album Indelibly Stamped in June 1971, Supertramp began to fracture as they lost their funding and Farrell, Currie and Winthrop all left the band between 1972 and 1973.

Davies and Hodgson rebuilt Supertramp in 1973, bringing in new members Dougie Thomson on bass, Bob Siebenberg on drums and John Helliwell on saxophone and woodwind instruments, who together released the band's "breakthrough" album Crime of the Century in 1974. This lineup remained stable for a total of ten years, until Hodgson left in 1983 following a period of "musical differences" with the rest of the group, mainly Davies. The group continued as a four-piece with touring musicians following Hodgson's departure, releasing the less successful Brother Where You Bound in 1985 and Free as a Bird in 1987, before breaking up the following year.

=== 1996 onwards ===
In 1996, Supertramp reformed with returning members Davies, Siebenberg and Helliwell, plus new members Mark Hart (keyboards, guitar, vocals), Carl Verheyen (guitar, backing vocals), Cliff Hugo (bass), Lee Thornburg (trumpet, trombone, backing vocals) and Tom Walsh (percussion). After the release of Some Things Never Change in 1997, Walsh was replaced by Jesse Siebenberg, son of drummer Bob. Slow Motion followed in 2002. Davies and Hodgson tried on several occasions to reunite in Supertramp, to no avail. In April 2010, Davies reformed Supertramp to commemorate the band's 40th anniversary, with Gabe Dixon replacing Mark Hart, and new member Cassie Miller joining on backing vocals. Hart returned in 2015, although a concert tour was cancelled due to Davies undergoing treatment for cancer. Davies died on 6 September 2025.

== Members ==
Image	Name	Years active	Instruments	Release contributions
	Rick Davies	1969–1988; 1996–2002; 2010–2011; (died 2025)	vocals; keyboards; harmonica; piano	all Supertramp releases
	Roger Hodgson	1969–1983	vocals; piano; guitar; keyboards; bass; occasional cello, flageolet, marimba, vibraphone, electric sitar and percussion	all Supertramp releases from Supertramp (1970) to ...Famous Last Words... (1982); Is Everybody Listening? (2001)
	Richard Palmer	1969–1971	guitar; vocals; balalaika	Supertramp (1970)
	Keith Baker	1969–1970	drums; percussion	none
	Robert Millar	1970–1971 (died 2024)	drums; percussion	Supertramp (1970)
	Dave Winthrop	1970–1973	saxophone; woodwind; occasional lead vocals	Indelibly Stamped (1971)
	Kevin Currie	1971–1973	drums; percussion	Indelibly Stamped (1971)
	Frank Farrell	1971–1972 (died 1997)	bass; backing vocals; occasional piano and accordion	Indelibly Stamped (1971)
	Dougie Thomson	1972–1988	bass; live backing vocals; occasional keyboards	all Supertramp releases from Crime of the Century (1974) to Live '88 (1988); Is Everybody Listening? (2001)
	Bob Siebenberg	1973–1988; 1996–2002; 2010–2011	drums; percussion; occasional backing vocals	all Supertramp releases from Crime of the Century (1974) onwards
	John Helliwell	1973–1988; 1996–2002; 2010–2011	saxophone; woodwind; clarinet; keyboards; brass; backing vocals; occasional percussion	all Supertramp releases from Crime of the Century (1974) onwards
	Carl Verheyen	1996–2002; 2010–2011 (touring 1985–86)	guitar; backing vocals	Some Things Never Change (1997); It Was the Best of Times (1999); Slow Motion (2002); 70–10 Tour (2010)
	Lee Thornburg	1996–2002; 2010–2011 (session 1986–87)	trumpet; trombone; backing vocals	Free as a Bird (1987); Some Things Never Change (1997); It Was the Best of Times (1999); Slow Motion (2002); 70–10 Tour (2010)
	Cliff Hugo	1996–2002; 2010–2011	bass; occasional backing vocals	Some Things Never Change (1997); It Was the Best of Times (1999); Slow Motion (2002); 70–10 Tour (2010)
	Mark Hart	1996–2002 (touring 1985–88)	keyboards; guitar; vocals	all Supertramp releases from Free as a Bird (1987) onwards, except Is Everybody Listening? (2001) and 70–10 Tour (2010)
	Tom Walsh	1996–1997	percussion; backing vocals	Some Things Never Change (1997)
	Jesse Siebenberg	1997–2002; 2010–2011	percussion; keyboards; guitars; vocals	It Was the Best of Times (1999); Slow Motion (2002); 70-10 Tour (2010)
	Gabe Dixon	2010–2011	keyboards; percussion; vocals	70-10 Tour (2010)
	Cassie Miller	2010–2011	backing vocals	70-10 Tour (2010)

=== Touring ===
Image	Name	Years active	Instruments	Release contributions
	Scott Page	1983–1986	saxophone; woodwind; guitar; backing vocals	The Story So Far... (1983/1990); Brother Where You Bound (1985); Free as a Bird (1987)
	Fred Mandel	1983	keyboards; guitar; backing vocals	The Story So Far (1983/1990); Some Things Never Change (1997)
	Marty Walsh	1984–1988	guitar; backing vocals	Brother Where You Bound (1985); Free as a Bird (1987); Live '88 (1988)
	Brad Cole	1985 (Note: Brad Cole filled in for Scott Page on the Brother Where You Bound tour.); 1987–1988	saxophone; keyboards	Live '88 (1988)
	Steve Reid	1987–1988 (died 2025)	percussion	Free as a Bird (1987); Live '88 (1988)

=== Session ===
Image	Name	Years active	Instruments	Release contributions
	Slyde Hyde	1978 (died 2019)	tuba and trombone	Breakfast in America (1979)
	Gary Mielke	1978	Oberheim programming	Breakfast in America (1979)
	Claire Diament	1981–1982	backing vocals	...Famous Last Words... (1982)
	Ann Wilson	1981–1982	backing vocals	...Famous Last Words... (1982)
	Nancy Wilson	1981–1982	backing vocals	...Famous Last Words... (1982)
	Cha Cha	1984–1985	backing vocals	Brother Where You Bound (1985)
	David Gilmour	1984–1985	guitar solos	Brother Where You Bound (1985)
	Scott Gorham	1984–1985	rhythm guitar	Brother Where You Bound (1985)
	Doug Wintz	1984–1985	trombone	Brother Where You Bound (1985)
	Brian Banks	1984–1985	Synclavier programming	Brother Where You Bound (1985)
	Anthony Marinelli	1984–1985	Synclavier programming	Brother Where You Bound (1985)
	Gary Chang	1984–1985	Fairlight & PPG programming	Brother Where You Bound (1985)
	Nick Lane	1987	brass	Free as a Bird (1987)
	Lon Price	1987	brass	Free as a Bird (1987)
	David Woodford	1987	brass	Free as a Bird (1987)
	Linda Foot	1987	backing vocals	Free as a Bird (1987)
	Lise Miller	1987	backing vocals	Free as a Bird (1987)
	Evan Rogers	1987	backing vocals	Free as a Bird (1987)
	Karyn White	1987	backing vocals	Free as a Bird (1987)
	Karen Lawrence	1996	backing vocals	Some Things Never Change (1997)
	Kim Nail	1996	backing vocals	Some Things Never Change (1997)
	Bob Danziger	1996	Kalimbas	Some Things Never Change (1997)

== Lineups ==
Period	Members	Releases
1969–1970	Rick Davies – vocals, keyboards, piano, harmonica; Roger Hodgson – vocals, bass; Richard Palmer – guitar, vocals; Keith Baker – drums, percussion	none
1970	Rick Davies – vocals, keyboards, piano, harmonica; Roger Hodgson – vocals, bass, guitar; Richard Palmer – guitar, vocals; Robert Millar – drums, percussion	Supertramp (1970)
1970–1971	Rick Davies – vocals, keyboards, piano, harmonica; Roger Hodgson – vocals, bass, guitar; Richard Palmer – guitar, vocals; Robert Millar – drums, percussion; Dave Winthrop – saxophone, flute, backing vocals	none
1971–1972	Rick Davies – vocals, keyboards, piano, harmonica; Roger Hodgson – vocals, guitar, bass; Frank Farrell – bass, keyboards, backing vocals; Kevin Currie – drums, percussion; Dave Winthrop – saxophone, flute, backing vocals	Indelibly Stamped (1971)
1972–1973	Rick Davies – vocals, keyboards, piano, harmonica; Roger Hodgson – vocals, piano, keyboards, bass, guitar; Dougie Thomson – bass; Kevin Currie – drums, percussion; Dave Winthrop – saxophone, flute, backing vocals	none
1973–1983 Classic lineup	Rick Davies – vocals, keyboards, piano, harmonica; Roger Hodgson – vocals, piano, keyboards, bass, guitar; Dougie Thomson – bass; Bob Siebenberg – drums, percussion; John Helliwell – saxophone, clarinet, keyboard, backing vocals	Crime of the Century (1974); Crisis? What Crisis? (1975); Even in the Quietest Moments... (1977); Breakfast in America (1979); Paris (1980); ...Famous Last Words... (1982); Is Everybody Listening? (2001)
1983–1988	Rick Davies – vocals, keyboards, piano, harmonica; Dougie Thomson – bass; Bob Siebenberg – drums, percussion; John Helliwell – saxophone, clarinet, backing vocals	Brother Where You Bound (1985); Free as a Bird (1987); Live '88 (1988)
Band inactive 1988–1996
1996–1997	Rick Davies – vocals, keyboards, piano, harmonica; Carl Verheyen – guitar, backing vocals; Cliff Hugo – bass; Bob Siebenberg – drums, percussion; Mark Hart – keyboards, guitar, vocals; John Helliwell – saxophone, clarinet, backing vocals; Lee Thornburg – brass, backing vocals; Tom Walsh – percussion, backing vocals	Some Things Never Change (1997)
1997–2002	Rick Davies – vocals, piano, keyboards, harmonica; Carl Verheyen – guitar, backing vocals; Cliff Hugo – bass; Bob Siebenberg – drums, percussion; Mark Hart – keyboards, guitar, backing vocals; John Helliwell – saxophone, clarinet, backing vocals; Lee Thornburg – brass, backing vocals; Jesse Siebenberg – percussion, backing vocals	It Was the Best of Times (1999); Slow Motion (2002)
Band inactive from 2002 to 2010
2010–2012	Rick Davies – vocals, piano, keyboards, harmonica; Carl Verheyen – guitar, backing vocals; Jesse Siebenberg – guitar, percussion, keyboards, vocals; Cliff Hugo – bass; Bob Siebenberg – drums, percussion; Gabe Dixon – keyboards, percussion, vocals; John Helliwell – saxophone, clarinet, backing vocals; Lee Thornburg – brass, backing vocals; Cassie Miller – backing vocals	70–10 Tour (2010)
