= School (Supertramp song) =

Single by Supertramp

from the album Crime of the Century
- B-side: "Oh Darling"
- Released: 1983
- Recorded: 1974
- Genre: Progressive rock; jazz fusion
- Length: 5:35
- Label: A&M
- Songwriters: Rick Davies, Roger Hodgson
- Producers: Supertramp, Ken Scott

Supertramp singles chronology
"Don't Leave Me Now" (1983)	"School" (1983)	"Cannonball" (1985)

Official audio
- "School" on YouTube

Crime of the Century track listing
- 1. "School"; 2. "Bloody Well Right"; 3. "Hide In Your Shell"; 4. "Asylum"; 5. "Dreamer"; 6. "Rudy"; 7. "If Everyone Was Listening"; 8. "Crime of the Century"

"School" is a song co-written by Rick Davies and Roger Hodgson of British rock band Supertramp, and included on the band's third and breakthrough 1974 album, Crime of the Century, of which it was the opening track. Although not released as a single at the time, it was later released in 1983, backed with "Oh Darling", a track from their 1979 album Breakfast in America. In 1984, it was released in West Germany to promote the compilation Die Songs Einer Supergruppe. In 1989, the single was re-released as part of the promotion around The Very Best of Supertramp. This time, the single peaked at No. 27 in The Netherlands.

== Writing and recording ==
Hodgson stated that "'School' was one of the songs that Rick [Davies] and I collaborated on. It was my song basically but Rick helped me with a lot of the lyrics. The piano solo was his, and it worked really well."

== Music and lyrics ==
The song starts with a long, slow harmonica intro. Hodgson’s verse vocals are first only above his flanged guitar, and then an elongated, strummed guitar section before the song finally fully kicks in. Davies later provides a bright piano lead. It has been described as presaging a similar approach used on Pink Floyd's "Another Brick in the Wall (Part Two)", a centrepiece of the band's 1979 similar concept album The Wall.

Hodgson stated that the song is "basically saying that what they teach us in schools is all very fine, but it’s what they don’t teach us in schools that creates so much confusion in our being. They don’t really prepare us for life in terms of teaching us who we are on the inside. They teach us how to function on the outside and to be very intellectual, but they don’t tell us how to act with our intuition or our heart or really give us a real plausible explanation of what life’s about."

Prog contributor Daryl Eastlea said that "'School' married Hodgson’s rally against his upbringing with Davies’ ever-remarkable piano break."

== Live performances ==
"School" became a live staple for the band, and was used to open their concerts, as seen in the albums Paris and Is Everybody Listening?. It is the third most performed song in the band's live repertoire. After Roger Hodgson left the band in 1983, he performed it on all of his solo tours.

== Reception ==
"School" was well-received, despite not being one of their biggest charting hits. Besides its appearance on many live and compilation albums, Ultimate Classic Rock ranks the song 3rd among the band's top 10 songs. Ultimate Classic Rock critic Nick DeRiso called it a "jazz fusion-informed gem" with "free-form creativity and plaintive lyric (part nostalgia, part fitful rebellion)" and "stirring musical specificity (the vivid piano lead, the growling harmonica, the thudding bass)." Classic Rock critic Paul Elliott described "School" as having "melodic sophistication and powerful expression of existential angst. The Cecil Whig critic Kris Kielich rated "School" as the 4th best song about school, saying that "With this underrated Supertramp classic, Roger Hodgson sings about making sure the rules don't tie you down in life. It's not just about education, it's about education of life, which is what makes this song so enduring decades later."

Hodgson himself considers it as one of his 10 best songs.

== Other releases ==
- Paris
- The Very Best of Supertramp
- It Was the Best of Times
- Is Everybody Listening?
- Retrospectacle – The Supertramp Anthology (Both single and double-disc editions)
- 70-10 Tour

== Charts ==
- Netherlands: number 27 (14 weeks) – 1989
- Spain: number 1 – 2020
