= Hacks (1997 film) =

- Theatrical release poster
- Directed by: Gary Rosen
- Written by: Gary Rosen
- Produced by: Matt Salinger
- Starring: Stephen Rea; Illeana Douglas; John Ritter; Dave Foley; Richard Kind; Dusty Kay; Robert Patrick; Tom Arnold
- Cinematography: Ralf D. Bode
- Edited by: Mark Fitzgerald
- Music by: Anthony Marinelli
- Production company: Shoreline Entertainment
- Release date: September 19, 1997
- Running time: 93 minutes
- Country: United States
- Language: English

Hacks (a.k.a. Sink or Swim and The Big Twist) is a 1997 American comedy film written and directed by Gary Rosen. The film premiered at the AFI Los Angeles Film Festival.

== Plot ==
Brian is a television writer-producer who is working on creating a 22-episode show, but has writer's block and needs inspiration. He teams up with a group of writer friends to write about a sexual encounter he watches on a balcony.

He witnesses a strange romantic encounter between two figures on the balcony of a hotel near his flat and decides to write scripts with his writer friends based on what he saw.

== Cast ==
- Stephen Rea as Brian
- Illeana Douglas as Georgia Feckler
- John Ritter as Hank
- Dave Foley as Neil
- Richard Kind as Benny
- Dusty Kay as Ira Gold
- Tom Arnold as Danny
- Robert Patrick as Goatee
- Ryan O'Neal as Dr. Applefield
- Jason Priestley as The Dude
- Olivia d'Abo as Lynn
- Lisa Kudrow as Reading
- Bob Odenkirk as Cell

== Reception ==
Leonard Klady of Variety magazine called it "a flip, intermittently amusing satire" and praised the cast but wrote: "the picture has little to offer in the way of insight or reflection and therefore won't translate outside of a small, insider crowd."
