= It Was the Best of Times =

It Was The Best of Times

Live album by Supertramp
- Released: 12 April 1999 Double CD version 27 April 1999 Single CD version
- Recorded: 19–20 September 1997
- Venues: Royal Albert Hall (London, UK)
- Genres: Progressive rock, pop rock, art rock
- Length: 130:08 Double CD version 75:22 Single CD version
- Label: EMI
- Producer: Rick Davies

Supertramp chronology
Some Things Never Change (1997)	It Was The Best of Times (1999)	Is Everybody Listening? (2001)

It Was the Best of Times is the third live album by the British rock band Supertramp, released in April 1999. The album title makes use of the opening line from A Tale of Two Cities by Charles Dickens.

== Overview ==
It Was the Best of Times was recorded in September 1997 at the Royal Albert Hall, London, England, UK during the "It's About Time" tour (set up in support of the Some Things Never Change studio album).

The band includes vocalist/guitarist/keyboardist Mark Hart performing songs originally sung by Roger Hodgson.

Supertramp are also augmented by additional players added for this album and tour which later would also take part in the recording of Slow Motion, the follow-up studio album released in 2002.

The 2-CD version features the song "Don't You Lie to Me", a blues song that the band had performed on their 1988 tour and the only song not written by a current or former band member.

The single CD version was later re-released in 2006 under the name of Live, 1997.

== Reception ==
Professional ratings
Review scores
Source	Rating
AllMusic	2.5/5 stars
Encyclopedia of Popular Music	2/5 stars

Reviewing the double CD edition, AllMusic wrote that in comparison to the single CD version, "...this two-CD set packs on eight further selections from Supertramp's career to that point, still eschewing their first two LPs, without really adding anything to the portrait painted by the slimmer edition."

== Track listing ==
All songs written by Rick Davies and Roger Hodgson, except where noted.

=== 2-CD version ===
==== Disc 1 ====
1. "It's a Hard World" – 9:17 (Rick Davies)
2. "You Win, I Lose" – 4:36 (Davies)
3. "Listen to Me Please" – 5:03 (Davies)
4. "Ain't Nobody But Me" – 6:14
5. "Sooner or Later" – 7:35 (Davies, Mark Hart)
6. "Free as a Bird" – 4:49 (Davies)
7. "Cannonball" – 7:52 (Davies)
8. "From Now On" – 8:05
9. "Breakfast in America" – 2:47
10. "Give Me a Chance" – 4:39 (Davies, Hart)
11. "Rudy" – 8:05

==== Disc 2 ====
1. "Downstream" – 3:53
2. "Another Man's Woman" – 11:21
3. "Take the Long Way Home" – 5:10
4. "Bloody Well Right" – 6:58
5. "The Logical Song" – 4:04
6. "Goodbye Stranger" – 6:52
7. "School" – 6:27
8. "And the Light" (Davies) – 5:03
9. "Don't You Lie to Me (I Get Evil)" – 3:31 (Tampa Red)
10. "Crime of the Century" – 7:46

=== 1-CD version: Live, 1997 ===
1. "You Win, I Lose" – 4:44 (Davies)
2. "Listen to Me Please" – 5:03 (Davies)
3. "Sooner or Later" – 7:35 (Davies, Hart)
4. "Free as a Bird" – 4:49 (Davies)
5. "Cannonball" – 7:52 (Davies)
6. "From Now On" – 7:44
7. "Breakfast in America" – 2:47
8. "And the Light" – 5:03 (Davies)
9. "Take the Long Way Home" – 5:10
10. "Bloody Well Right" – 6:58
11. "The Logical Song" – 4:04
12. "Goodbye Stranger" – 7:24
13. "School" – 6:32

== Personnel ==
- Rick Davies – vocals, keyboards, harmonica
- Mark Hart – vocals, keyboards, guitars
- Carl Verheyen – guitars
- Cliff Hugo – bass
- John Helliwell – saxophone, woodwind
- Lee Thornburg – trumpet, trombone
- Bob Siebenberg – drums
- Jesse Siebenberg – percussion

== Charts ==
Chart (1999)	Peak position
Austrian Albums (Ö3 Austria)	42
Belgian Albums (Ultratop Wallonia)	10
Dutch Albums (Album Top 100)	21
French Albums (SNEP)	3
German Albums (Offizielle Top 100)	29
Norwegian Albums (VG-lista)	19
Swiss Albums (Schweizer Hitparade)	12
UK Albums (Official Charts)	91

== Certifications ==
Region	Certification	Certified units/sales
France (SNEP)	Gold	100,000^{*}
^{*} Sales figures based on certification alone.
