= Scream (Chad Wackerman album) =

Studio album by Chad Wackerman
- Released: June 20, 2000
- Recorded: Megaphon Recording Studios in Sydney; Castle Oaks Productions in Calabasas, California
- Genre: Jazz fusion
- Length: 52:02
- Label: Favored Nations
- Producer: Chad Wackerman

Chad Wackerman chronology
The View (1993)	Scream (2000)	Legs Eleven (2004)

Scream is the third studio album by drummer Chad Wackerman, released on June 20, 2000 through Favored Nations Entertainment.

== Critical reception ==
Professional ratings
Review scores
Source	Rating
All About Jazz	Favorable
AllMusic	4/5 stars

Glenn Astarita at All About Jazz gave Scream a positive review, praising Wackerman's "intrinsic musical approach to the drums". He described the album as following the same direction as Forty Reasons (1991) and The View (1993), but also remarked that "overall, the album lacks some of the tenacity witnessed on the drummer's previous projects as the invariable pace and somewhat plodding flow supersedes some of its brighter moments."

John W. Patterson at AllMusic gave the album four stars out of five, saying "Scream does a great job of measuring up to all those prior efforts overall and continues Wackerman's reputation for great fusion", in response to whether it measures up to Forty Reasons and The View. He went on to praise guitarist James Muller as "superb [...] tight, fluid, innovative" and likened his playing to that of Allan Holdsworth, whom previously played with Wackerman.

== Track listing ==
All music is composed by Chad Wackerman, except where noted.

No.	Title	Length
1.	"Scream"	6:05
2.	"Between the Dog and the Wolf"	5:28
3.	"The City"	7:56
4.	"Looking In"	1:02
5.	"Days Gone By"	6:07
6.	"Timeless"	5:56
7.	"Cycles"	5:05
8.	"The Way Out" (Wackerman, Leon Gaer, James Muller, Daryl Pratt)	0:46
9.	"Holland"	4:13
10.	"The Grey Chair"	1:03
11.	"My Two Worlds"	7:03
12.	"Youse from Here?" (Wackerman, Leon Gaer, James Muller, Daryl Pratt)	1:18
Total length:		52:02

== Personnel ==
- Chad Wackerman – drums, percussion, production
- James Muller – guitar
- Daryl Pratt – synthesizer, vibraphone, percussion
- Jim Cox – synthesizer, piano, organ
- Leon Gaer – bass
- Walt Fowler – flugelhorn
- Guy Dickerson – engineering, mixing
- Bernard Mathews – engineering
