= Dreams Nightmares and Improvisations =

Studio album by Chad Wackerman
- Released: February 2012
- Genre: Jazz fusion
- Length: 53:20
- Label: Self-release
- Producer: Chad Wackerman

Chad Wackerman chronology
| Legs Eleven (2004) | Dreams Nightmares and Improvisations (2012) |

Professional ratings
Review scores
| Source | Rating |
|---|---|
| JazzTimes | Favorable |

Dreams Nightmares and Improvisations is the fifth studio album by drummer Chad Wackerman, released independently in February 2012. For the first time since Wackerman's 1993 album The View, Allan Holdsworth is featured on guitar and Jimmy Johnson on bass.

== Track listing ==
| No. | Title | Length |
|---|---|---|
| 1. | "Glass Lullaby" | 2:32 |
| 2. | "A New Day" | 6:59 |
| 3. | "Bent Bayou" | 4:00 |
| 4. | "Star Gazing" | 2:42 |
| 5. | "Edith Street" | 3:38 |
| 6. | "The Fifth" | 6:38 |
| 7. | "Waterways" | 3:08 |
| 8. | "The Billows" | 5:49 |
| 9. | "Monsieur Vintage" | 3:38 |
| 10. | "Rapid Eye Movement" | 2:33 |
| 11. | "Brain Funk" | 3:28 |
| 12. | "A Spontaneous Story" | 3:56 |
| 13. | "Two for Ya" | 2:44 |
| 14. | "Invisible" | 1:35 |
| Total length: | | 53:20 |

== Personnel ==
- Chad Wackerman – drums, percussion
- Allan Holdsworth – guitar, SynthAxe, keyboards
- Jim Cox – keyboard
- Jimmy Johnson – bass guitar
