= Thank You Shirl-ee May =

Thank You Shirl-ee May (A Love Story)

Studio album by Shawn Amos
- Released: September 13, 2005
- Genre: Folk rock
- Length: 35:55
- Label: Shout! Factory
- Producer: Anthony Marinelli, Shawn Amos

Shawn Amos chronology
In Between (2002)	Thank You Shirl-ee May (A Love Story) (2005)	Harlem (2011)

Thank You Shirl-ee May (A Love Story) is Shawn Amos's second studio album. It was released in 2005 on Shout! Factory.

With his second release, Amos chronicles the career of his mother, a club singer in the 1960s. Shawn discovered his mother’s professional life as Shirl-ee May only after her suicide in July 2003. Amos says album is a tender tribute to his mother, Shirlee Ellis Amos. Songs like " "New York City 1964" and "The Bottle Always Brings Me Down" explore the life of the singer known as Shir-lee May.

== Track listing ==
All tracks are written by Shawn Amos, except where noted.

No.	Title	Length
1.	"Thank You Shirl-ee May"	2:26
2.	"New York City 1964 (A Letter Home)"	3:55
3.	"Bubble Hill"	4:38
4.	"You're Groovy (For Boy Blue)"	2:50
5.	"Make It"	3:28
6.	"The Bottle Always Brings Me Down"	3:19
7.	"Getting Over"	3:29
8.	"(What's) Good Inside"	3:23
9.	"Dear Lord (written by Joseph Arthur)"	4:35
10.	"Bad Timing"	3:52
Total length:		35:55

== Background ==
Throughout Amos' childhood and adulthood, his mother suffered from schizoaffective disorder and ultimately committed suicide in 2003. The trauma of the event and his subsequent discovery of her early singing career were the inspiration behind his 2005 album release Thank You Shirl-ee May. He has since donated his time to the mental health organizations Didi Hirsch Community Mental Health Center in Los Angeles and the Rita Project in New York. Amos has also dedicated much of his time to local non-profit organizations dedicated to working with at-risk youth.

== Players ==
- Shawn Amos (vocals)
- Garrison Starr, Solomon Burke (vocals)
- Ben Peeler (guitar, lap steel guitar)
- Patrick Milligan (acoustic guitar, banjo, bass guitar, background vocals)
- Clint Bennett (acoustic guitar)
- Ray Parker Jr., David E. Williams (electric guitar)
- David Henry (cello)
- Chuck Findley (trumpet, flugelhorn)
- Anthony Marinelli (piano, Wurlitzer piano, ARP synthesizer, Moog synthesizer)
- John Thomas (piano)
- Roger Len Smith (bass instrument)
- Tim Landers (double bass, bass guitar)
- Gregg Bissonette (drums, tambourine)
- Robert Jolly (drums)
