= The Beepers =

American band

The Beepers was an American music band consisting of Anthony Marinelli, Arthur B. Rubinstein, Brian Banks and Cynthia Morrow. They provided the theme song "Murphy's Law" for the film Blue Thunder (1983). Their single "Video Fever" and the song "History Lesson" are used in the soundtrack for the 1983 film WarGames.

Brian Banks and Anthony Marinelli were already known for work together for performances as a synthesizer duo, such as a live performance of Tchaikovsky's Overture to Romeo and Juliet and other works as an opener for a 1980 concert of the Los Angeles Philharmonic at the Dorothy Chandler Pavilion.

Banks and Marinelli continue to work together on film music compositions, and with many backing band album credits:

- Pulse (Greg Phillinganes album)
- Young Guns (film) soundtrack
- Nice Girls Don't Explode soundtrack
- Baby Be Mine (Michael Jackson song)
- Brother Where You Bound
- Behind the Mask (song)
- Internal Affairs (film)
- Unity (Afrika Bambaataa and James Brown song)
- Thriller (Michael Jackson album)
- Pinocchio and the Emperor of the Night
