= My Sexiest Year =

2007 American romantic comedy/drama film by Howard Himelstein

- Theatrical release poster
- Directed by: Howard Himelstein
- Written by: Howard Himelstein
- Produced by: Michael Cerenzie; Paul Parmar
- Starring: Frankie Muniz; Harvey Keitel; Haylie Duff; Frances Fisher
- Cinematography: Richard Crudo
- Edited by: Dean Goodhill
- Music by: Anthony Marinelli; (original songs); Dr. John; Anthony Marinelli
- Distributed by: THINKFilm
- Release date: October 18, 2007 (Hamptons International Film Festival)
- Country: United States
- Language: English

My Sexiest Year is a 2007 American romantic comedy drama film starring Frankie Muniz and Harvey Keitel and was written and directed by Howard Himelstein. The film is a romantic coming-of-age story in which the kindness bestowed by a glamorous model is returned 30 years later by the young man in whom she inspired the first stirrings of confidence and love. The film takes place in 1970s Miami and was shot in various locations such as Collins Avenue and Coral Gables Senior High School.

The film had its world premiere at the 2007 Hamptons International Film Festival. As of 2022, the film has yet to receive a DVD/Blu-ray release date.

== Plot ==
Jake Stein (Frankie Muniz) is a 17-year-old who lives with his sick mother and grandfather in Brooklyn. He wants nothing more than to be a writer, but when his mother's health takes a turn for the worse, Jake is sent to Miami to live with his father, "Zowie" (Harvey Keitel), a small-time "handicapper" who gives horse racing tips for a living. Not much of a parent, Zowie has shirked his fatherly responsibilities for most of his son's life. Nonetheless, Jake is excited about the prospects of bonding with his father in sunny Miami.

Jake quickly befriends Mark, a local rich kid, whose excessive drug use helps him get through the pressures of teenage life in Southern Florida, where the "in" crowd only cares about how much money one's parents make, who's coming to one's pool party, and whether or not one is getting laid. As Jake tries to navigate the waters of his new home—while trying to connect with his eccentric father—he meets Marina (Amber Valletta), a famous model who is in town for a photo shoot; the two quickly bond. Jake reminds Marina of her younger brother, who died in a motorcycle accident, and Jake is unable to get over the fact that such a beautiful woman is interested in him. But just when things seem to be going right, all goes terribly wrong. Jake must figure out how to become a man, if he is ever going to finish writing his memoir.

== Cast ==
- Frankie Muniz as Jake Stein
  - Christopher McDonald as Adult Jake Stein
- Harvey Keitel as Zowie
- Amber Valletta as Marina
- Ryan Cabrera as Rickie
- Haylie Duff as Debbie
- Karolína Kurková as Pia
- Frances Fisher as Faye
- Allan Rich as Papa
- Victor Alfieri as Fabrizio Contini
- Nick Zano as Pierce
- Rachel Specter as Sue Ryker
- Dan Levy as Mark
- Daphna Kastner as Gloria
- Noah Matthews as Mikey
- Ali Costello as Allison
- Chick Bernhard as Rosie
- Ashley Blackwell as Rena
- Jill Curran as Tammy
- Nay K. Dorsey as Jimbo
- Angelina Hakansson as Karina
- Michelle Jones as Shelly Jenkins
- Luis Selgas as Freddy Wilson
- Alfred Nittoli as Gene
- Ante Novakovic as Ange
- Luke Pierucci as Vinny
- Sal Richards as Nick
- Jennifer Safina as Liz
- Anthony Schweiker as Eddie
- Roger Wilson as Paul
- Evis Xheneti as Greta
- Christine Hitt as Pool Girl (uncredited)
