= Gideon (film) =

1999 film directed by Claudia Hoover

Gideon is a 1998 American romantic tragic comedy starring Christopher Lambert, Charlton Heston and Carroll O'Connor. The film was directed by Claudia Hoover and written by Brad Mirman with music by Anthony Marinelli.

== Plot ==
Gideon Oliver Dobbs is a man with a mental disability. He moves into a nursing home known as Lakeview, with many elderly inhabitants. They are all grumpy old men and women. Gideon is much younger than the other residents, which causes confusion when he first introduces himself. His view of life makes the seniors look at their lives in a different way.

== Cast ==
Actor/Actress	Role
Christopher Lambert	Gideon
Charlton Heston	Addison Sinclair
Carroll O'Connor	Leo Barnes
Shirley Jones	Elly Morton
Mike Connors	Harland Greer
Barbara Bain	Sarah
Shelley Winters	Mrs. Willows
Crystal Bernard	Jean MacLemore
Christopher McDonald	Alan Longhurst
Mykelti Williamson	Coleman Walker
Taylor Nichols	Dr. Richard Willows
Michael Bowen	Billy Ray Turner
Harvey Korman	Jacob Titleman
Mackenzie Rosman	Molly MacLemore
John Swift	Stunt Biker #1
Jerry Craig	Stunt Biker #2

== Reception ==
Variety gave a negative review of the film, stating, "Despite its old gold cast, Gideon stubbornly remains a schmaltzy, derivative tale about a simpleton-sage (Christopher Lambert) whose underage sojourn in a hope-gone rest home revolutionizes the residents’ lives. This determinedly heartwarming pic with a tempo suited for sleepy TV viewers should hobble its way to family auds in ancillary markets." TV Guide offered a very similar assessment: "Sweet-tempered and thoroughly tame, this unmemorable film is best enjoyed as an excuse to watch a superlative line-up of veteran stars strut their stuff as they breathe life into stereotypical roles."
