= John Mader =

Drummer

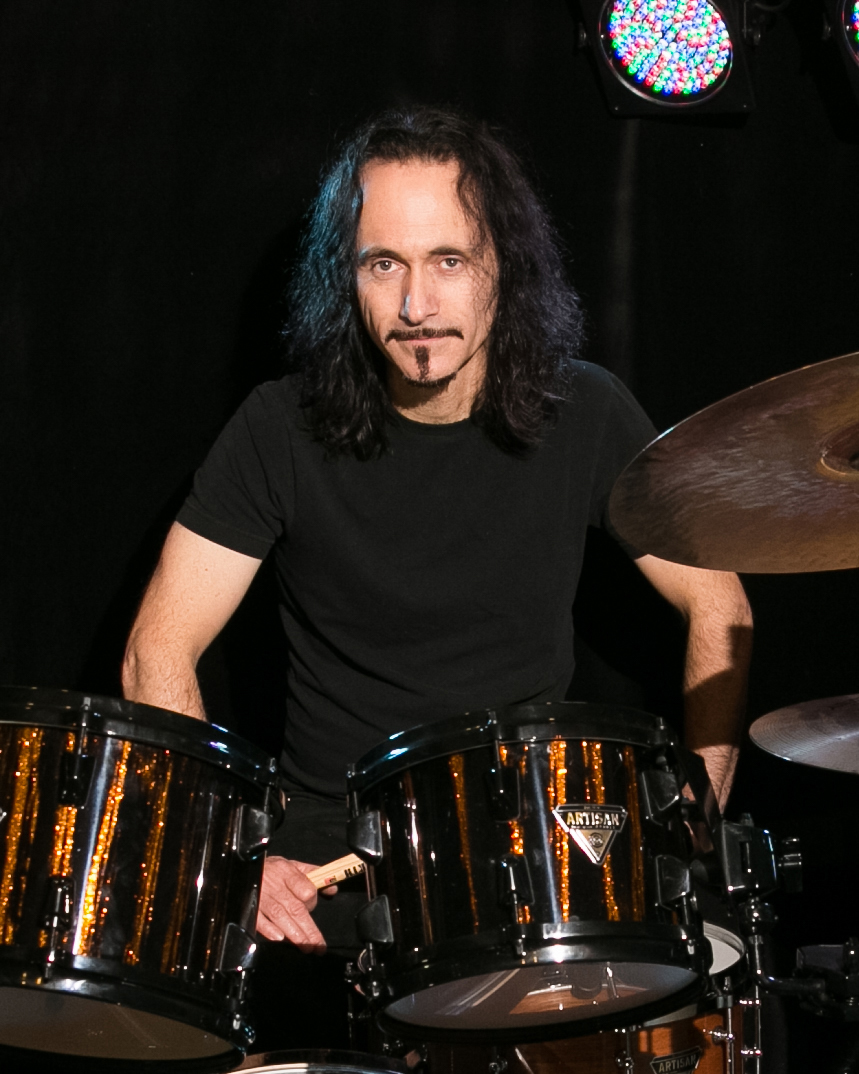
- Mader in 2012

Background information
- Birth name: John Andrew Mader
- Born: October 22, 1963 (age 61); Oakland, California, U.S.
- Genres: Rock; Alternative Rock; Pop; Jazz; Theater
- Occupations: Drummer; Drum Instructor
- Instrument: Drums
- Years active: 1981–present
- Labels: The Rocket Record Company; 415 Records
- Website: johnmader.com

John Andrew Mader (born October 22, 1963) is an American drummer who has performed and recorded with such successful acts as Pat Benatar, Steve Miller, Josh Groban, Bonnie Raitt, Booker T. Jones, the Family Stone, Gregg Allman, Joe Satriani, Patti Austin, and Billy Sheehan among others. He has also played drums on such hit musicals as Rent, Wicked, Mamma Mia!, The Lion King, and Hamilton.

== Early life ==
John Mader was born on October 22, 1963, the son of Ruth (née Markham), a cab dispatcher, and Norman Mader, a cab driver who was also a professional musician. While in kindergarten he attended a talent show at school and saw a young boy playing drums and was inspired to learn to play the drums and went on to play in the school orchestra, marching band, choir, jazz band, and musicals in elementary and primary school.

During high school he performed and toured with the Pepsi sponsored music group, Youth of America, replacing Will Kennedy of The Yellow Jackets. They were a big band with a horn section, choir, and dancers and performed at festivals and corporate events in the San Francisco bay area.

== Music career ==
Mader began working as a professional musician at seventeen years old and joined the San Francisco Bay Area band The Uptones when he was twenty one years old. The Uptones toured the U.S. opening for Billy Idol, UB40, Oingo Boingo, Red Hot Chili Peppers, and many others, as well as winning a BAMMY Award.

He has performed with jazz recording artists Pee Wee Ellis, Fred Wesley, Maceo Parker, and Roy Hargrove, among others.

As a member of the band with Ryan Downe, Mader performed on two U.S tours opening for The Who on the Quadrophenia Tour in 1997. Downe was signed to Rocket Records, a label created by Elton John.

He was asked to play drums on the film score for Blindspotting, by Daveed Diggs (who wrote, produced and starred in the film) and had performed in the original cast of Hamilton.

=== Musical theater ===
Mader played drums for the world premiere of the Tony Award winning Wicked (original New York cast) and The Lion King (San Francisco). He then relocated to Los Angeles to play drums for Hamilton.

- Rent
- Wicked
- Mamma Mia!
- The Lion King
- Hamilton

== Equipment endorsements ==
- Dixon Drums (Artisan Maple series - 14 snare, 22 bass, and 10, 12, 14, 16 toms)
- Vic Firth (drum sticks)
- Sabian (Evolution series Ride and Crashes and Artisan Hi Hats)

== Discography ==
Year	Artist	Album	Credit
2017	Jane Getter	Jane Getter Premonition on Tour	Drums
2016	Carl Verheyen	The Grand Design	Drums
2015	Stuart Hamm	Book of Lies	Drums
2013	Shoshana Bean	O'Farrell Street	Drums
2011	Stuart Hamm featuring Joe Satriani	Just Outside of Normal	Drums
2007	Stuart Hamm	Stu X 2 Live	Drums
2005	The Sims 2: University	strategic life-simulation video game	Drums
2003	Johnny Colla	Lucky Devil	Drums
2002	Chuck Prophet	No Other Love	Drums
2002	The Sims Vacation	strategic life-simulation video game	Drums
2002	Jenna Mammina	Meant to Be	Drums
2001	Pee Wee Ellis featuring Fred Wesley	Live and Funky	Drums
2001	The Sims Hot Date	strategic life-simulation video game	Drums
2001	The Sims House Party	strategic life-simulation video game	Drums
2000	Garth Webber and Mark Ford	On the Edge	Drums
2000	Pee Wee Ellis featuring Lenny Williams	Ridin' Mighty High	Drums
1998	Patti Austin	In and Out of Love	Drums
1998	Matt Nathanson	Not Coloured Too Perfect	Drums
1996	Flamin' Groovies	Step Up	Drums
