= Harlem (album) =

Studio album by Shawn Amos
- Released: February 15, 2011
- Recorded: Early 2000 at Amos’ Fairfax district apartment, Los Angeles, California
- Genre: Americana music
- Length: 40:08
- Label: Unbreakable Records
- Producer: Shawn Amos, Patrick Milligan

Shawn Amos chronology
Thank you Shirl-ee May (2005)	Harlem (2011)

Harlem is an album by artist Shawn Amos. Harlem was released on February 15, 2011.

Amos titled the album Harlem after being inspired by a museum exhibit dedicated to the Harlem Renaissance.

== Track listing ==
All tracks are written by Shawn Amos, except where noted.

No.	Title	Length
1.	"Independence Day"	3:54
2.	"Vicksburg"	1:37
3.	"Southern Man" (written by Neil Young)	5:51
4.	"Blackface"	4:57
5.	"Mean As You"	3:29
6.	"Inside Out"	5:08
7.	"Vicious Circle"	3:11
8.	"Fire Down Below"	3:35
9.	"Goin East"	5:41
10.	"Angel In Black"	2:45
11.	"Long Time Gone" (With Julie Miller, Bonus iTunes track)	2:17
Total length:		40:08

== Players ==
- Shawn Amos sings, plays acoustic & electric guitars, harmonica, plus banjo on "Vicksburg"
- Patrick Milligan plays banjo, electric & acoustic guitar, and sings
- Ben Peeler plays lap steel, mandolin, and dobro
- Roger Len Smith plays bass and sings
- Robert Jolly plays drums
- Chris Anderson plays piano, plus guitar on "Blackface"
- John Thomas plays organ and piano
- David Henry plays cello and organ
- Gia Ciambotti sings
- Derf Reklaw plays congas on "Blackface"
- Mark Olson sings, plus plays harmonica on "Independence Day"
- Frank "Poncho" Sampedro plays guitar on "Southern Man"
- Jeremy Parzen plays electric guitar on "Angel in Black"
- Charlie George plays snare on "Angel in Black"
- The 3 J's sing on "Vicious Circle"
- Ian Whitcomb arranges brass section on "Goin' East"
