= 70-10 Tour =

- Cover of the Nantes, 12 October 2010 edition of the album

Live album by Supertramp
- Released: 2010
- Recorded: 2010, Throughout Europe
- Genre: Progressive rock, pop rock, art rock
- Label: Simfy Live

Supertramp chronology
Retrospectacle – The Supertramp Anthology (2005)	70-10 Tour (2010)	Live in Paris '79 (2012)

70–10 Tour is a series of live albums from the British rock band Supertramp's 70-10 tour, commemorating the 40th anniversary of the band. Each concert from the tour was recorded and released on CD or as an MP3 download. Although "Don't You Lie to Me" only appears on the album from the second Paris concert, the final show of the tour, there are few differences in set lists (with "Asylum" played only twice in Freiburg and Verona between "Downstream" and "Rudy").

== Set list (Paris, 28 October 2010) ==
- All songs written by Rick Davies and Roger Hodgson, except where noted.
- All lead vocals by Rick Davies, except where noted.

No.	Title	Original album	Length
1.	"You Started Laughing"	Single B-Side	4:21
2.	"Gone Hollywood"	Breakfast in America	5:56
3.	"Put on Your Old Brown Shoes"	...Famous Last Words...	4:36
4.	"Ain't Nobody But Me"	Crisis? What Crisis?	8:01
5.	"Breakfast in America" (Lead Vocals: Jesse Siebenberg)	Breakfast in America	2:55
6.	"Cannonball" (Writer: Rick Davies)	Brother Where You Bound	8:06
7.	"Poor Boy"	Crisis? What Crisis?	5:36
8.	"From Now On" (Lead Vocals: Rick Davies + Jesse Siebenberg)	Even in the Quietest Moments	9:10
9.	"Give A Little Bit" (Lead Vocals: Jesse Siebenberg)	Even in the Quietest Moments	4:17
10.	"Downstream"	Even in the Quietest Moments	3:26
11.	"Rudy" (Lead Vocals: Rick Davies + Gabe Dixon)	Crime of the Century	8:02
12.	"It's Raining Again" (Lead Vocals: Gabe Dixon)	...Famous Last Words...	4:34
13.	"Another Man's Woman"	Crisis? What Crisis?	11:59
14.	"Take the Long Way Home" (Lead Vocals: Gabe Dixon)	Breakfast in America	5:12
15.	"Bloody Well Right"	Crime of the Century	7:50
16.	"The Logical Song" (Lead Vocals: Jesse Siebenberg)	Breakfast in America	5:56
17.	"Goodbye Stranger"	Breakfast in America	6:42
18.	"Don't You Lie to Me" (Writer: Hudson Whittaker)	Tampa Red cover	4:47
19.	"School" (Lead Vocals: Jesse Siebenberg + Rick Davies)	Crime of the Century	6:30
20.	"Dreamer" (Lead Vocals: Gabe Dixon + Rick Davies)	Crime of the Century	3:34
21.	"Crime of the Century"	Crime of the Century	7:57

== Personnel ==
- Rick Davies – Keyboards, harmonica, lead & backing vocals
- Jesse Siebenberg – Guitar, keyboards, percussion, lead & backing vocals
- John Helliwell – Saxophones, clarinet, melodica, backing vocals, MC
- Bob Siebenberg – Drums and percussion
- Cliff Hugo – Bass guitar
- Carl Verheyen – Guitar, backing vocals
- Lee Thornburg – Trumpets, tuba, melodica, additional keyboards, backing vocals
- Gabe Dixon – Keyboards, percussion, lead & backing vocals
- Cassie Miller – Backing vocals
