= Anthony Marinelli =

American musician (born 1959)

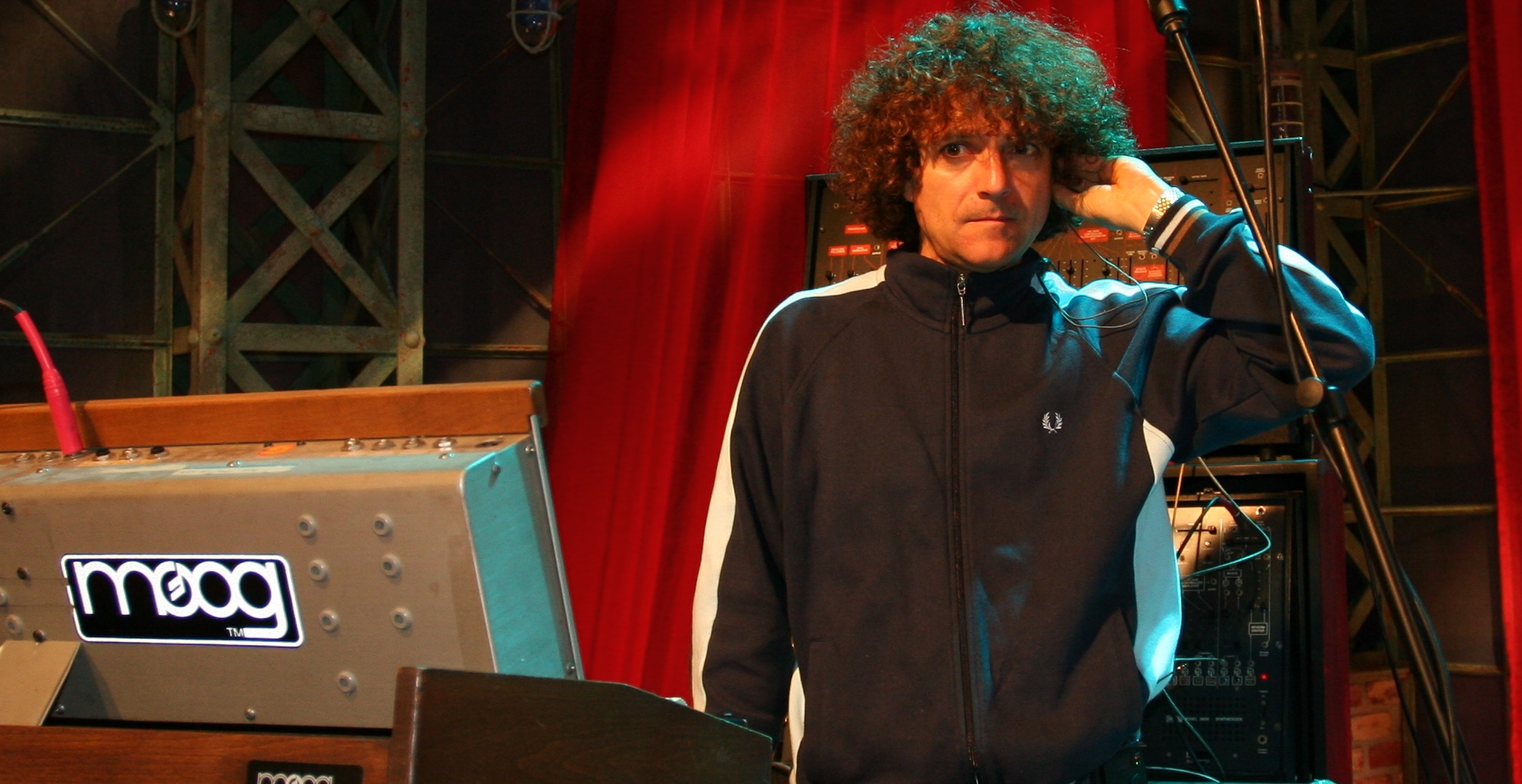
- Marinelli on The Tonight Show with Jay Leno in March 2006

Background information
- Born: Anthony Joseph Marinelli; March 19, 1959 (age 67); Burbank, California, U.S.
- Genres: Film score; electronic; R & B; pop music; classical; jazz; latin
- Occupations: Musician; composer; programmer; conductor; songwriter; record producer
- Instruments: Keyboards; synthesizers; drums
- Years active: 1977–present
- Labels: Tommy Boy; Shout! Factory; Varèse Sarabande; Milan; Edel America; MCA
- Website: anthonymarinelli.com

Anthony Marinelli (born March 19, 1959) is an American musician, composer, synth programmer, record producer and conductor. In his early career, he composed and performed synthesizer programming for albums including Michael Jackson's Thriller (1982). Marinelli has also recorded with Lionel Richie, Kenny Loggins, Herb Alpert, Supertramp, The Crystal Method, Billy Childs and James Brown.

Marinelli was a contributor in the production of Quincy Jones' soundtrack for Steven Spielberg's The Color Purple (1985) and composed for Young Guns (1988), Graveyard Shift (1990), Leaving Las Vegas (1996), and Internal Affairs (1990).

Excluding episodic-television and commercials, Marinelli's filmography contains over one hundred feature film credits with an AACTA award nomination for the Australian film My Forgotten Man (1993). For television, he won a Daytime Emmy Honors Award for his work on the TV series Santa Barbara (1986–87). Marinelli has also won four Clio Awards, two AICP Awards, two ADDY Awards, three Indian Telly Awards and a Cannes Silver Lion Award for his musical contributions on television commercials. He composed the music for the infamous "Fried Egg" version of This Is Your Brain on Drugs television commercial.

Marinelli co-founded, incubated and hosted Levels Audio Post, a post production service; the venture serviced the television shows: American Idol (Fox), The Bachelor (ABC), the Teen Choice Awards (Fox) and the MTV Award Shows. In musical theatre, Marinelli completed BollyDoll, a Bollywood genre extravaganza with visual artist and vocalist, Amrita Sen, directed by Shekhar Kapur in 2013.

In December 2022, Marinelli became the co-host and producer of the podcast series Stories in the Room: Michael Jackson's Thriller Album Podcast, which has gone viral on social media.

== Background ==
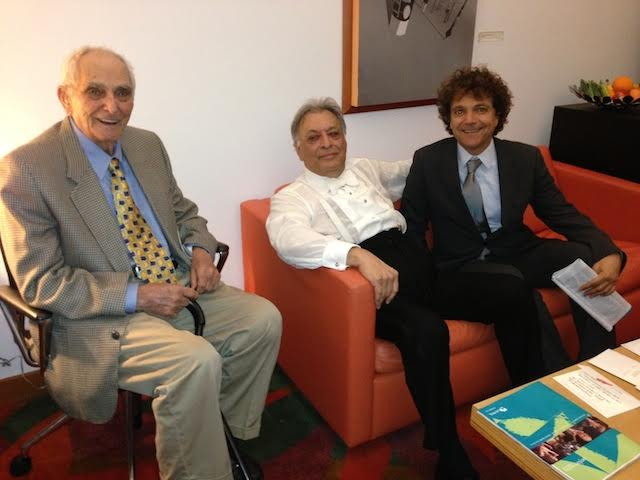
Carmine Marinelli (Left), Zubin Mehta
and Anthony Marinelli (2012)

Anthony Marinelli is the son of Carmine Marinelli (born in Vinchiaturo, Molise), the former Master of Properties at the Dorothy Chandler performing arts center. Marinelli took an interest in his father's work and was exposed to operas, ballet, musicals and symphonies during his childhood. Marinelli was personally introduced to Charlie Chaplin, Frank Sinatra, Zubin Mehta and Katharine Hepburn. He attended the annual Academy Award ceremonies with his family, beginning at age nine.

=== Influences ===
Marinelli decided on a career in music after hearing Switched-On Bach (1968) by Wendy Carlos. In addition to classical composers, other early influences were Keith Emerson, Keith Jarrett, John Williams, Ennio Morricone, and Jerry Goldsmith. Marinelli credits Arthur B. Rubinstein, Jack Nitzsche, Quincy Jones and Giorgio Moroder as his mentors.

=== Education ===
Marinelli's piano lessons began at age six and he was performing with Lamont Dozier and other Motown artists professionally by age sixteen. He studied piano and music theory under Lowndes Maury from 1967 to 1975. He studied synthesizer under Clark Spangler (1975–80), and continued piano under Terry Trotter (1976–80), Spud Murphy (music composition from 1978–85) and Hans Beer (conducting from 1993–99). Marinelli studied jazz improvisation under Charlie Shoemake from 1978 to 1982.

In 1977, Marinelli graduated with the first coed class at Providence High School in Burbank, California. He studied piano and music composition at the University of Southern California School of Music and played the Los Angeles jazz circuit with the band Night Flight, featuring Billy Childs and vocalist Dianne Reeves. Marinelli attended USC from 1977 to 1982, but withdrew with film and recording project offers pending.

Marinelli was one of ten conductors selected to attend the fourth annual BMI Film Conducting Workshop in 2001.

=== Personal life ===
Marinelli and his wife Cynthia Gomes live with their children (Cora and Gretel) in the Los Angeles area. Marinelli has two children (Dante and Zachariah) from his previous marriage to Jill Schoelen. Marinelli holds dual-citizenship (United States and Italy); his Italian citizenship is inherited through his father's lineage. He is a licensed soccer coach and has been an LA Galaxy season ticket holder since the team's move to Carson, California in 2003. He has been a patron of the Los Angeles Philharmonic since 1980 and is a founding member of the Electronic Music Alliance (EMA).

== Synclavier synthesizers ==
Marinelli became interested in analog synthesizers in his teenage years. His piano instructor knew of another student with these interests and introduced Marinelli to Brian Banks. Marinelli and Banks became known for performances as a synthesizer duo, including as an opener for the Los Angeles Philharmonic in 1980.

KFAC live simulcasts from the Natural History Museum of Los Angeles County
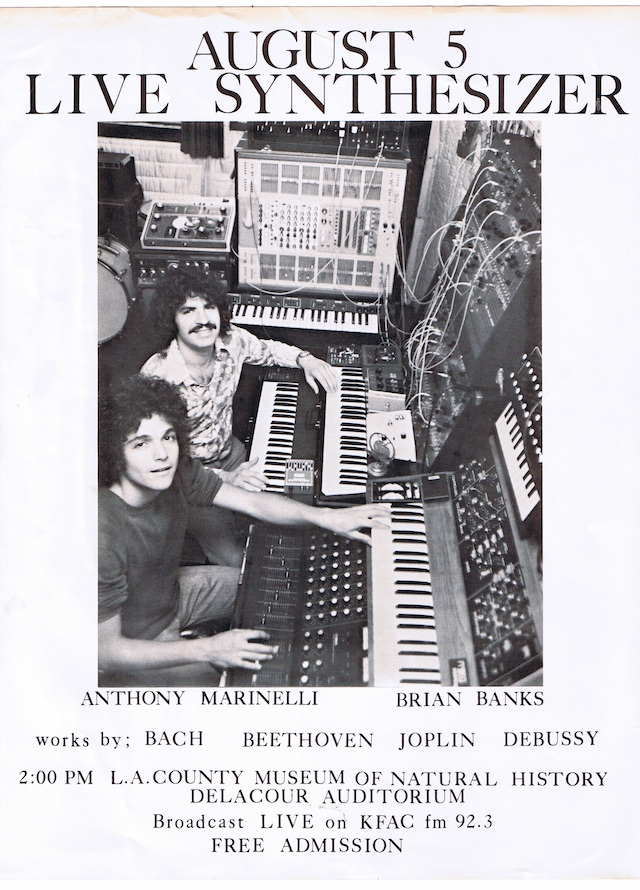
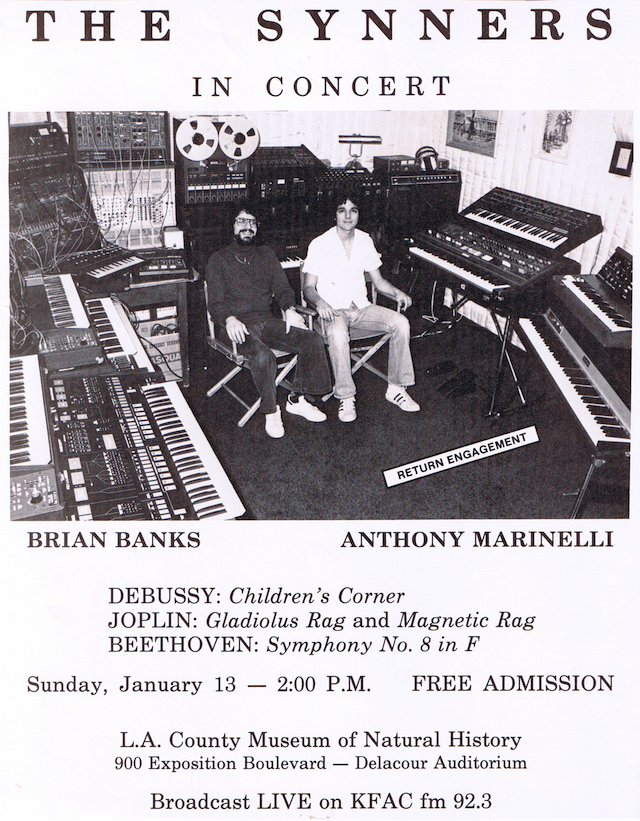
Marinelli and Banks, August 1979 and January 1980.

Live KFAC radio broadcast classical works such as Toccata and Fugue in D minor, BWV 565, Fugue in G minor, "Little", BWV 578, Beethoven Symphony No 8 in F Major, Tchaikovsky Romeo & Juliet Fantasy Overture and other performances as Marinelli's synthesizer group The Synners expanded their reach.

Marinelli and Banks then teamed with Emmy Award-winning composer Arthur B. Rubinstein, creating one of the first known digitally synthesized musical scores, Blue Thunder, released in 1983. The trio joined with Cynthia Morrow as The Beepers, and their songs, "Video Fever" and "Long Line Leading To Men", made the soundtrack for the 1983 film, WarGames. The Beepers song "Theme from Blue Thunder (Murphy's Law)" was used in Blue Thunder with an instrumental version closing the film.

The film industry expressed interest in synthesizer technology while Banks and Marinelli simultaneously emerged as experts in the practical application of the new technology. Banks and Marinelli made a "polaroid" of the Quincy Jones soundtrack for The Color Purple (1985) available to director Steven Spielberg during filming and editing. This process allowed the score to be completely written before orchestral musicians were hired.

"...Anthony got very involved with consulting for the development of the Synclavier. A lot of things that are on the instrument are our fault! It's a nice feeling to be involved in the development of a musical instrument".

—Brian Banks, "Synthesizer Upstarts Conquer Hollywood", Keyboard, Sept. 1987, by Jeff Burger

== Thriller memorialized ==
In 2015, Marinelli sat for an interview with the BBC, reflecting on his memories and contributions to Michael Jackson's Thriller. Tom Bahler had introduced Marinelli to music producer Quincy Jones. Jones hired Marinelli and business partner, Brian Banks, as session musicians at Westlake Studios in West Hollywood for the creation of Thriller. In addition to bringing in three truckloads of synthesizer gear, preliminary duties consisted of briefing Michael Jackson on the capabilities of the emerging technologies, sound creation and programming.

The BBC "Witness" radio podcast was followed by three How We Created It pilot vlog series. In the first episode, Marinelli demonstrates how to recreate the "falling star" sound that opens the "Thriller" song. The following two-part series is called "Studio Stories". Quincy Jones' production assistant, Steven Ray, joined Marinelli to reminisce in 2020. Marinelli and Ray continued recording episodes and were approached by Audivita Studios for the creation of Stories In The Room: "Michael Jackson's Thriller Album", with 72 episodes, posted as of February 2024.

Stories in The Room guest appearances include:

- Matt Forger (sound engineer)
- Lorraine Fields ("Thriller" zombie dancer)
- Larry Williams (keyboards and reeds)
- Greg Phillinganes (keyboards)
- Steve Porcaro (keyboards, composer on "Human Nature")
- Paul Jackson Jr. (guitar, no relation to Michael Jackson)
- The Waters Family (vocal ensemble, Julia Waters Tillman. Oren Waters, and Maxine Willard Waters)

With Stories in The Room largely completed, Marinelli continues to discuss music topics like sound creation, musical gear and composing on his own Youtube channel. Episodes that have gained media attention include: "How I Programmed The Bass On Michael Jackson's PYT", "MJ's Billie Jean Bass - It's 4 Instruments!" featuring Ernest Tibbs., and "The Billie Jean Chord Stack - It's 4 Sounds!". Additional noteworthy topics include jams with Doctor Mix, and a discussion of Giorgio Moroder's work process with engineer Ross Hogarth,

Marinelli appears in the film Thriller 40 (2023) (Showtime - Paramount+) from his studios.

== Studio CEO ==
From 1977 to 1983, Marinelli's Synner Productions worked from a converted pool-house at his parents' home, eventually equipped with a New England Digital Synclavier II, 24 track analog tape and mixer, and Dolby Spectral Recording with noise reduction for film projects. Marinelli moved into digital with a Synclavier Direct to Disk synthesizer and digital tape prior to renovating and moving the studio to a circa 1913, Art Deco style, building at 1606 N Highland in Hollywood.

=== Sonar Productions ===
From 1983 to 1993, Marinelli and Brian Banks operated and composed out of the three studio complex at the corner of Hollywood Blvd and Highland Blvd as Sonar Productions. The studio was designed by Bret Thoeny and constructed by Marinelli's audio engineer, Mark E. Curry. The team worked individually and together during this time period; notable credits include: WarGames (1984), Starman (1984), The Color Purple (1985), Stand by Me (1985), Planes, Trains and Automobiles (1987), Young Guns (1988) and Internal Affairs (1990).

=== Music Forever ===
Marinelli continued to operate his Hollywood studios as a sole proprietor, establishing the trade name Music Forever in 1993. Marinelli's commercial television award nominations increasingly included wins, among them, an AICP Award and an ADDY Award in 1994 for his Apple Computer campaigns, two Silver Hugo Awards (1997) for his work with Mercedes-Benz, Mobius and Telly awards in 1998 and 1999. In addition to episodic television and documentaries, Marinelli's feature film credits for this period include the critically acclaimed, Leaving Las Vegas (1996), Timecode (2000) and The Man from Elysian Fields (2001).

==== Levels Audio Post ====
Marinelli co-founded and incubated a post-production service company called Levels Audio Post. Conceptualized in October 1998, Marinelli designed and installed a fourth studio in Music Forever Studios and enlisted a mixer, Brian Riordan as his co-founder. Levels Audio Post opened its doors on July 16, 1999. Streamlining the post-production process was accomplished by assigning audio specialists with established musicianship credentials to oversee each project from beginning to end. The ProTools facility featured two mix stages with 5.1 surround sound, 16-foot projection and auxiliary sound design rooms.

After early successes in the television commercial genre, their new production technique began to catch on and Audio Levels Post landed the television series American Idol (2001), followed by American Juniors (2003) and MTV's Viva La Bam (2003). Music specials included: Justin Timberlake: Down Home in Memphis (2003), Hilary Duff's Island Bash (2003) and the 2003 MTV Movie Awards.

Co-founder Brian Riordan received his first Primetime Emmy Award nomination (for mixing) on American Idol in 2003 and The Academy Awards show in 2004. Riordan purchased Marinelli's interest in Levels Audio Post in August 2004 and leased the Levels Audio Post portion of the Hollywood facility from Marinelli for an additional two years. Riordan is a three-time Emmy Award winner.

Marinelli and his staff compose from a nondescript location in the San Fernando Valley.

== Polaroids (orchestral mockups) ==
Marinelli explained in a 1987 interview, "We did what we call Polaroids— we did the whole score before it was recorded by orchestra".(p. 62) The use of the term "polaroids", which are now called orchestral mockups, was borrowed from the Polaroid instant camera, which delivered color prints moments after taking a picture. In a 2007 interview, Quincy Jones reflected briefly on how the polaroid concept revolutionized film and recording industry work-flow process.

Banks and Marinelli spend a lot of time assisting film composers in the studio and were responsible for the first digital synthesis and sampling for a film with "Blue Thunder" and programmed and performed the first polaroid (orchestral simulation) of the entire musical score for "The Color Purple".

"As far as we know, this was the first time this had ever been done", Marinelli said.

—"Sonar Prods. specializes in synthesizing", The Hollywood Reporter, by Bill Desowitz, June 4, 1986.

Synthesizer technology was a controversial addition to the film industry, a lack of understanding came from professional orchestral musicians. Having a synthesist present can minimize the need to hire larger sections of musicians. Additionally, musician time can be reduced by having the arrangements realized with synthesizers to match the edited film before performing the score with a live orchestra.(pp. 70, 72) Because of these factors, synthesists were initially considered a threat to employment from the musician's union.(p. 72) As musicians, these concerns were not lost on Marinelli and Banks, their proposal for the overdub scale (synthesist's scale) was accepted by the union in 1985. "We came up with a proposal that synthesists should be paid by the hour at an inflated rate, with an unlimited amount of overdubs, doubles or anything else they're called upon to do".(p. 72)

== Orchestration and conducting ==
In The Family Way (2006)
Los Angeles Philharmonic

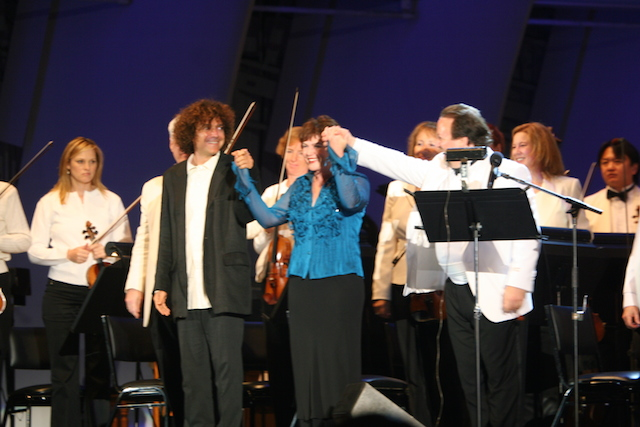
Composer Anthony Marinelli (left)
Actress/comedian Julia Sweeney
Conductor Lucas Richman (right)

Orchestral works, which have gained wider recognition for Marinelli, include the score for the biopic Chapter 27 (2007), using a 60 piece orchestra with the score being similar instrumentally to Tchaikovsky's, Nutcracker Suite. In the Family Way was performed by the Los Angeles Philharmonic Orchestra, featuring the comedy of Julia Sweeney at the Hollywood Bowl on August 25 and 26, 2006.

Marinelli composed a tone poem, In the Family Way, featuring narration by writer/actress Julia Sweeney, Commissioned by the L.A. Philharmonic, the 22-minute piece, performed for 2 nights with a 90 piece orchestra at the Hollywood Bowl, is based on Sweeny's adoption of a baby from China and her travels as a single parent.

—"Award Winning Film Composer", Music Connection, by Dan Kimpel, January 1, 2007

At the onset, the combination of musician, arranger, orchestrator and synthesist was in high demand.(p. 58) Later, Marinelli's credentials and formal training provided the opportunity to also conduct orchestras. Marinelli has stated that he had put his analog synthesizers in storage and had worked without them for about a decade.

In addition to composing, Marinelli conducted orchestras on the following feature films: Flynn (1993), Hacks (1997), Gideon (1998), Scar City (1998), The Runner (1999), Slow Burn (2000), 15 Minutes (2001) starring Robert De Niro and Edward Burns and The Man from Elysian Fields (2001) starring Andy Garcia, Mick Jagger and Olivia Williams. The made for television films, Don King: Only in America (1997) and Songs in Ordinary Time (2000) were also composed and conducted by Marinelli.

== Film career ==
Marinelli was exposed to and studied the styles of many modern composers. His early success in the film industry began with the patronage of jazz/pop composer and producer Quincy Jones, classical composer and conductor Arthur B. Rubinstein, pop/disco songwriter and producer Giorgio Moroder, and classic-rock composer and arranger Jack Nitzsche.

For Quincy Jones, Marinelli and former partner Brian Banks are credited with performance and synthesizer programming on Michael Jackson's Thriller album including the title track. In film, they provided a pre-production synthesized orchestra recording of Quincy Jones' score for The Color Purple (1985), allowing Jones and Steven Spielberg to adjust the score during editing and present a completed work to the orchestral musicians. The final score for the film was orchestrated rather than synthesized with some exceptions; for instance, the sound of a leaky roof landing in tin-cans in Cilie's living room segues into a musical piece played on an African kalimba. Additional titles where Marinelli has worked on Quincy Jones' productions include: The Slugger's Wife (1985), Tango & Cash (1989) and Cadillac Man (1990).

Emmy Award-winning composer and conductor Arthur B. Rubinstein relied on Marinelli and Banks for the Rubinstein scored films, Blue Thunder (1983) and WarGames (1983). Marinelli is also credited on the Rubinstein score for Best of Times (1986), and Marinelli and Banks are credited on Stakeout (1987). Accustomed to working with classically trained musicians, Rubinstein joined in a musical group with Marinelli, Banks and vocalist Cynthia Morrow called The Beepers. Songs from The Beepers include "Murphy's Law", the theme song for Blue Thunder, "Video Fever" and "History Lesson" in WarGames.

Three-time Academy Award winner Giorgio Moroder used Marinelli and Banks on the soundtracks for Cat People (1982), Over the Top (1987), Let it Ride (1989). Marinelli's solo work with Moroder includes: The World (1988), The NeverEnding Story II: The Next Chapter (1990), Moroder and Marinelli co-composed the score together for Jackpot (1992). Oscar-winning composer Jack Nitzsche brought Marinelli and Banks industry credit with Streets of Gold (1986) the Oscar nominated films, Starman (1984) and Stand By Me (1986).

A significant milestone for Marinelli and Banks was composing the original score to the #1 box-office hit, Young Guns (1988), prior to their ending their partnership in 1993. Still completing numerous feature films per year, Marinelli's responsibilities increased, more often working with directors rather than in support roles under other composers. With the transition from a partnership in Sonar Productions to the sole proprietor of Music Forever, Marinelli also worked on television commercials.

Marinelli continued composing with filmmaker and composer Mike Figgis, writing the theme for Leaving Las Vegas in 1995 and co-composing the scores on Internal Affairs (1990), Timecode (2000) and Hotel (2001). Timecode is a 90-minute experimental film, performed live and filmed on four time-synchronized, hand-held digital cameras. Combining music composition techniques with film-making, the script was developed during single-take rehearsal performances by writer/director Figgis and the actors themselves. Each actor recorded personal script notes on blank, four octave, music paper, with each octave representing a camera view and vertical separations representing each minute of camera time capacity. The film is presented with each camera point-of-view as one fourth of the screen, dialog and music determines which of the four screen-frames is the active frame at that particular moment in time. For special screenings in Los Angeles area theaters, Figgis and Marinelli created alternate/spontaneous live mixes of the dialogue and music from the back of the theater. This allowed new story lines to unfold since the audience could hear dialogue from screen frames not active in the original released version.

Dr. John (left) and Anthony Marinelli
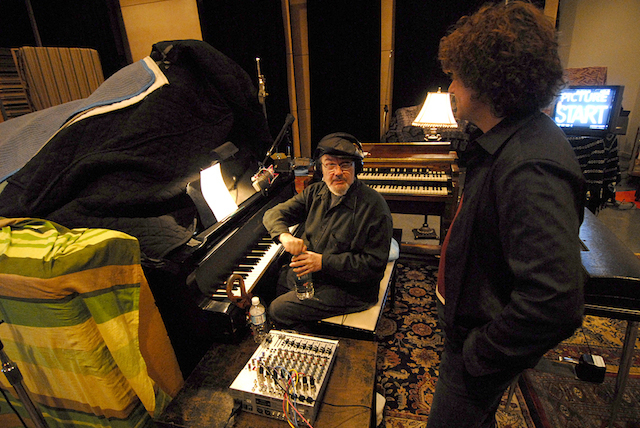
My Sexiest Year (2007)
Studio X, Seattle, WA

Marinelli scored the critically acclaimed release of George Hickenlooper's Mayor of the Sunset Strip (2004) documentary. The film is a montage of musicians such as (David Bowie, Cher, Blondie); a cast of Rodney Bingenheimer's "A-list" friends, "God heads" as he calls them. Bingenheimer is an autograph hound, turned groupie, turned unlikely star-maker via his trendy punk styled club, English Disco and as a long running disc-jockey for KROQ in Los Angeles.

A sampling of Marinelli's solitary composing credits for feature film include: The Man from Elysian Fields (2001), starring Andy Garcia and Mick Jagger, the critically acclaimed independent film, Self Medicated (2005), Jarrett Schaefer's controversial, Chapter 27 (2007), a biography of John Lennon's assassination, My Sexiest Year (2007) which gave Marinelli the opportunity to perform and write songs with Dr John, and Jada Pinkett Smith's, The Human Contract (2008). Recent completions include: Altergeist (2014), written and directed by Tedi Sarafian, Medicine Men (2015), starring Liza Weil, Shawn Hatosy and James LeGros, and Midnight Return (2015), written and directed by Sally Sussman Morina.

=== Filmography ===
Marinelli has scored the following films:

- Rigged (aka Hit and Run) (1986)
- Pinocchio and the Emperor of the Night (1987)
- Nice Girls Don't Explode (1987)
- Young Guns (1988)
- Voyage of De Liefde (1989)
- Spooner (1989)
- Graveyard Shift (1990)
- Internal Affairs (1990)
- Fools Rush In (1991)
- Jackpot (1992)
- House of Secrets (1993)
- There Was a Little Boy (1993)
- Reckless Kelly (1993)
- Marked for Murder (aka The Sandman) (1993)
- Flynn (1993)
- A Pig's Tale (1994)
- Baby Brokers (aka Stolen Hearts) (1994)
- The Innocent (1994)
- Just Looking (1995)
- Fight for Justice: The Nancy Conn Story (1995)
- Payback (1995)
- 2 Days in the Valley (1996)
- Underworld (1996)
- Invasion of Privacy (1996)
- One Tough Bastard (1996)
- Don King: Only in America (1997)
- Seed: A Love Story (1997)
- Masterminds (1997)
- Hacks (1997)
- Scar City (aka Scarred City) (1998)
- God Said Ha! (1998)
- Gideon (1998)
- Hoods (1998)
- The Runner (1999)
- Songs in Ordinary Time (2000)
- Blast (2000)
- Just One Night (2000)
- Slow Burn (2000)
- Timecode (2000)
- The Man from Elysian Fields (2001)
- 15 Minutes (2001)
- Hotel (2001)
- On Golden Pond (Live TV) (2001)
- Pavement (2002)
- Lone Hero (2002)
- Borderline (2002)
- American Gun (2002)
- Quicksand (2003)
- Consequence (2003)
- Mayor of the Sunset Strip (2003)
- Rolling Kansas (2003)
- She Kept Silent (2004)
- Self Medicated (2005)
- Code Breakers (2005)
- Memory (2006)
- Border War (2006)
- Dreamland (2006)
- Skills like This (2007)
- My Sexiest Year (2007)
- Ripple Effect (2007)
- Chapter 27 (2007)
- Sublime (2007)
- The Human Contract (2008)
- Grizzly Park (2008)
- Speechless (2008)
- Brothel (2008)
- Ronald Reagan: Rendezvous with Destiny (2009)
- Clouded (Short) (2009)
- Hick’ Town (2009)
- Blue (2009)
- Footsteps (2010)
- Amazon Gold (2012)
- Altergeist (2014)
- Medicine Men (2015)
- Midnight Return (2015)

== Discography ==
Marinelli's discography includes: Michael Jackson's Thriller (1982); Don Felder's Airborne (1983); Lionel Richie's Can't Slow Down (1983); Supertramp's Brother Where You Bound (1985); Kenny Loggins's Yesterday, Today, Tomorrow (1988) and Back to Avalon (1988). Marinelli has worked with recording artists James Brown, Herb Alpert, The Crystal Method, Billy Childs and Quincy Jones. Marinelli arranges and performs classical ballads and boleros with Cindy Gomez and Asdru Sierra (Ozomatli) in a multilingual group they call Trio Retro.

Anthony Marinelli discography
Year	Album / Song		Credit
1976	Library of Congress (1976–78)	Lamont Dozier	Musician
1982	Welcome to My Love	Dianne Reeves	Arranger / Musician
1982	Thriller	Michael Jackson	Musician
1983	Airborne	Don Felder	Arranger / Musician
1983	Can't Slow Down	Lionel Richie	Musician
1984	I Miei Americani	Cilintano	Musician
1984	Pulse	Gregg Phillinganes	Writer / Arranger / Musician
1984	"Unity"	James Brown & Afrika Bambaataa	Arranger/Musician
1985	Midland	Billy Childs	Arranger / Musician
1985	"Rap-O-Matic Rap"	Dumb Guys	Artist/Writer / Producer
1985	Brother Where You Bound	Supertramp	Musician
1986	Flaunt It	Sigue Sigue Sputnik	Musician
1986	SSS	Sigue Sigue Sputnik	Musician
1987	"Meet Me Halfway"; Over the Top (soundtrack)	Kenny Loggins	Arranger / Musician
1987	"Winner Takes it All"	Sammy Hagar	Arranger / Musician
1987	"Body Next to Body"	Falco featuring Brigitte Neilson	arranger/musician
1988	Back to Avalon	Kenny Loggins	Arranger / Musician
1988	"Sexy Lady"	Falco	Arranger / Musician
1988	"Hand in Hand" (Olympic theme song)	Giorgio Moroder & Koreana	Arranger / Musician
1988	The Best of Larry Wolf & the Streetbeaters	Larry Wolf & the Streetbeaters	Producer / Arranger / Musician
1989	Twilight is Upon Us	Billy Childs	Arranger / Musician
1990	"To Be Number One" (English title, 1990 FIFA World Cup theme song)	Giorgio Moroder Project	Musician / Arranger
1990	Seiko	Seiko	Musician
1990	Halfway to Heaven	Seiko Matsuda	Musician
1997	The Music Never Ends	Maureen McGovern	Arranger / Musician
1997	I've Known Rivers	Billy Childs	Musician
1997	Yesterday, Today, Tomorrow	Kenny Loggins	Arranger / Musician
1998	My Life: The Greatest Hits	Julio Iglesias	Musician
2005	The Essential Michael Jackson	Michael Jackson	Musician
2005	Thank You Shirl-ee-May (A Love Story)	Shawn Amos	Producer / Arranger / Musician
2006	Whipped Cream & Other Delights	Herb Alpert (a)	Producer / Remixer / Arranger / Musician
2006	What's Going On; Hurricane Katrina relief	The Dirty Dozen Brass Band (b)	Producer / Arranger / Musician
2006	The Harry Smith Project	Harry Smith (c)	Producer / Arranger / Musician
2006	The Harry Smith Project: Anthology of American Folk Music Revisited	Various	Producer, Soundtrack Producer
2008	Celebrating 25 Years of Thriller	Michael Jackson	Musician
2008	King of Pop	Michael Jackson	Musician
2009	True Meaning of Christmas	Bianca Ryan	Producer / Songwriter / Arranger / Musician
2014	"Grace"	The Crystal Method	Musician
2015	The Many Faces of Brandino	Brandino	Executive Producer
2015	Loves You	Shawn Amos	Musician
(a) Herb Alpert with: Thievery Corporation, Modeski, Martin & Wood, Ozomatli, John King, Mocean Worker, Camara Kambon and DJ Foosh (b) The Dirty Dozen Brass Band with: Chuck D, Betty LaVette, G Love, Guru and Ivan Neville (c) Harry Smith with: Beck, Elvis Costello, Wilco, Lou Reed, Sonic Youth, Nick Cave…

== Awards ==
Marinelli has been honored with Daytime Emmy Honors Award, Outstanding Music Direction and Composition for a Drama Series, for his work on Santa Babara (1986–87). His 1993 score for the film My Forgotten Man earned him an AACTA Award nomination. His work includes critically acclaimed commercials and public service announcements such as the fried egg version of This Is Your Brain on Drugs (1987), which Entertainment Weekly named the 8th best commercial of all time.

Year	Nominee / work	Award	Result
1986	Santa Barbara NBC (1986–87)	Daytime Emmy Honors Award; Outstanding Music Direction and Composition for a Drama Series	Won
1990	Calif. Dept. of Health Services Entire Campaign	Clio Award	Won
1990	California Anti Smoking "Ashtray"	Clio Award	Nominated
1990	California Anti Smoking "Industry Spokesman"	Clio Award	Nominated
1990	Apple "Industrial Revolution"	Clio Award	Nominated
1990	Apple Complete Campaign	Clio Award	Nominated
1992	GE: "ZAPPA" TV Commercial	Cannes Silver Lion Award	Won
1992	Apple Complete TV Campaign (1992)	Clio Award	Won
1992	Apple "Kareem" TV (1992)	Clio Award	Won
1993	Apple "Meeting" (1993)	Clio Award	Won
1992	Apple Newton "Making it Easier"	Clio Award	Nominated
1992	California Anti Smoking "Full Support"	Clio Award	Nominated
1992	Apple Complete Campaign	Clio Award	Nominated
1992	Earth Communications Office Movie Trailer	Clio Award	Nominated
1993	Apple "Where is Newton"	Clio Award	Nominated
1993	Apple "Powerbook" TV Campaign #1	Clio Award	Nominated
1993	Apple "TV Campaign" (1993)	Clio Award	Nominated
1993	Apple Newton "TV Campaign #1"	Clio Award	Nominated
1993	Flynn (aka My Forgotten Man)	AACTA Awards; Best Original Music Score, with Billy Childs	Nominated
1994	Apple "Who is Newton" (1994)	AICP Award	Won
1994	Apple "Diner"	AICP Award	Won
1994	Apple "Powerbook" TV Campaign	ADDY Award	Won
1994	Apple "Diner" TV Campaign	ADDY Award	Won
1995	AAA "Heritage"	Indian Telly Award	Won
1996	Sliders "In Dino Veritas"	MPSE Golden Reel Award	Nominated
1997	Mercedes "Smooth Ride" SUV Category (1997)	Silver Hugo Award	Won
1997	Mercedes "Smooth Ride" Automotive Category	Silver Hugo Award	Won
1997	Mercedes "Smooth Ride" Gold Plaque / Chicago International TV Competition	Silver Hugo Award	Won
1998	Grillmaster "Manifesto" Music	Mobius Award	Won
1998	Grillmaster "Manifesto" Agency	Mobius Award	Won
1999	Sharp Health Care "Wheel" Music	Telly Award	Won
1999	Sharp Health Care "Wheel" Agency	Telly Award	Won
2008	Best Original Score for Chapter 27	National Film Critics Circle	Nominated
