= Internal Affairs (film) =

1990 American crime thriller film directed by Mike Figgis

- Theatrical release poster
- Directed by: Mike Figgis
- Written by: Henry Bean
- Produced by: Frank Mancuso Jr.
- Starring: Richard Gere; Andy García
- Cinematography: John A. Alonzo
- Edited by: Robert Estrin
- Music by: Brian Banks; Mike Figgis; Anthony Marinelli
- Production companies: Out of the Town Films; Image Organization
- Distributed by: Paramount Pictures
- Release date: January 12, 1990
- Running time: 115 minutes
- Country: United States
- Language: English
- Budget: $15 million
- Box office: $47.7 million

Internal Affairs is a 1990 American neo-noir crime thriller film directed and scored by Mike Figgis, from a screenplay by Henry Bean, and starring Richard Gere and Andy García. The film follows Raymond Avilla (García), an Internal Affairs investigator for the Los Angeles Police Department, as he investigate Dennis Peck (Gere), a senior officer who may be using his colleagues as pawns for his own nefarious purposes.

The film was released by Paramount Pictures on January 12, 1990. It received positive reviews from critics and was a moderate commercial success, later gaining a following on home video.

== Plot ==
During a drug bust, LAPD officers Dennis Peck and Van Stretch assault a dealer and his girlfriend. Outside, fellow patrolman Dorian Fletcher mistakenly shoots an unarmed man. Peck plants a knife on the body to get the distraught Fletcher off the hook.

Raymond Avilla joins the LAPD's Internal Affairs Division (IAD) and is partnered with Amy Wallace to investigate the bust. They learn that Stretch abuses drugs, has a history of using excessive force and may be corrupt. Stretch is also abusive to his wife Penny, who he suspects of infidelity, and has a subservient friendship with Peck. Avilla's investigation into Peck reveals he is held up as an LAPD role model but his lifestyle (including spousal support for three ex-wives and eight children) isn't consistent with a patrolman's modest salary. After an altercation with Peck, Fletcher agrees to help Avilla's investigation.

Peck's corruption includes extortion, favors to cops and criminals alike, complicit dealings with pimps, and moonlighting as a hitman. Businessman Steven Arrocas offers Peck a large sum to kill his parents. Avilla pressures Stretch to provide evidence against Peck in exchange for immunity. Stretch calls Penny and tells her he will testify, unaware that Peck is having sex with her at that very moment.

During a routine patrol, Stretch is shot through the chest in a hit staged by Peck. Peck murders the gunman but the van used in the hit speeds away with a witness to Peck's crime. Peck finds Stretch wounded but alive and strangles him before the ambulance arrives. Avilla and Wallace set up a sting to catch the witness, but knowledge of the sting is leaked and Fletcher and the witness, Demetrio, are killed in a shootout. As he dies in Avilla's arms, Demetrio identifies Peck as Stretch's killer.

Avilla's marriage deteriorates due to his increased obsession with the case. Unrelated, Peck insinuates he would make advances on Avilla's wife, Kathleen. Now aware that Avilla is tailing him, Peck meets Kathleen in a public place, posing as an IAD investigator and feigning worries about Avilla's wellbeing. This angers Avilla, who has an outburst at the office. He is taken off-guard in the elevator and beaten by Peck, who deceitfully boasts that he seduced Kathleen. Avilla then has a violent public confrontation with Kathleen. The two make up the following morning when Kathleen convinces Avilla that she would have left him rather than ever cheat on him.

As the net tightens around Peck, the IAD discovers his many wives' inexplicable real estate holdings are handled by Penny. Penny refuses to cooperate, but Wallace correctly guesses her affair with Peck. Breaking under pressure, Peck's current wife Heather admits that two recent murder victims share the same surname as a Steven Arrocas who had contacted her husband. Meanwhile, Arrocas himself walks in on Peck having rough sex with his wife. Peck nonchalantly confirms that the contract killing of Arrocas's parents has been fulfilled and tries to goad Arrocas into killing his wife, but Arrocas shoots Peck in the foot instead. Avilla and Wallace show up shortly thereafter, finding the dead bodies of the Arrocases.

Peck is hiding and shoots Wallace, badly wounding her, then flees. Wallace tells Avilla and the ambulance driver that Peck shot her, ensuring a witness other than Avilla to Peck's identification. Avilla rushes home to find Peck holding Kathleen hostage. As he is beaten and shot in the leg by Avilla, Peck proudly boasts of his ability to manipulate Avilla, disingenuously ascribes his corruption and sociopathy to the need to provide for his offspring and insults Avilla's childlessness as selfish. Unwilling to go to prison, Peck pulls a knife out of his boot and lunges at Avilla, who shoots him dead.

== Cast ==
- Richard Gere as Dennis Peck
- Andy García as Raymond Avilla
- Nancy Travis as Kathleen Avilla
- Laurie Metcalf as Amy Wallace
- Richard Bradford as Grieb
- William Baldwin as Van Stretch
- Michael Beach as Dorian Fletcher
- John Capodice as Chief Healy
- Faye Grant as Penny
- Katherine Borowitz as Tova Arrocas
- John Kapelos as Steven Arrocas
- Xander Berkeley as Rudy Mohr

Additional cast members include Annabella Sciorra as Peck's wife Heather, Victoria Dillard as Kee, Pamella D'Pella as Cheryl, Allan Havey as Judson, Julio Oscar Mechoso as Gregory, Marco Rodríguez as Demetrio, Ron Vawter as Jaegar, Valerie Wildman as May, and Elijah Wood as Sean. Director Mike Figgis and producer Frank Mancuso Jr. both make cameo appearances in the film.

== Production ==
The film was co-produced by Out of the Town Films, an independent production company set up by Canadian producers René Malo and Pierre David. Filming began in Los Angeles on April 3, 1989.

== Reception ==
Internal Affairs was well received by critics; review aggregator Rotten Tomatoes gives it a 79% "Fresh" rating based on 33 reviews. Janet Maslin of The New York Times said, "Internal Affairs is, for the dim movie season that is traditionally January, an unusually bright light."

Audiences polled by CinemaScore gave the film an average grade of "B" on an A+ to F scale.

The film is included in The New York Times Guide to the Best 1,000 Movies Ever Made, based on reviews written in The New York Times from 1929 to 1998.

=== Box office ===
The movie was a moderate success but performed better on home video. It grossed $27.7 million in the United States and Canada and $20 million internationally for a worldwide gross of $47.7 million.
