= Legs Eleven =

Studio album by Chad Wackerman
- Released: 2004
- Recorded: 17–21 June 2003
- Studio: The Drum Room, Sydney
- Genre: Jazz fusion
- Length: 57:45
- Label: Australia Council for the Arts

Chad Wackerman chronology
Scream (2000)	Legs Eleven (2004)	Dreams Nightmares and Improvisations (2012)

Professional ratings
Review scores
Source	Rating
All About Jazz	Favorable

Legs Eleven is the fourth studio album by drummer Chad Wackerman, released in 2004 through the Australia Council for the Arts.

== Track listing ==
All music is composed by Chad Wackerman.

No.	Title	Length
1.	"Sophie's Beach"	7:10
2.	"Spiral"	5:58
3.	"Legs Eleven"	1:35
4.	"Where You Come From"	6:22
5.	"Newtown"	8:05
6.	"No Time Like the Future"	6:50
7.	"Field of Mars"	8:08
8.	"Tangara"	5:42
9.	"Rhythm Clock"	1:22
10.	"Balancing Acts"	6:36
Total length:		57:45

== Personnel ==
- Chad Wackerman – drums, percussion
- James Muller – guitar
- Daryl Pratt – synthesizer, vibraphone, marimba
- Leon Gaer – bass
- Guy Dickerson – engineering, mixing
- Don Bartley – mastering
