= Forty Reasons =

Studio album by Chad Wackerman
- Released: 1991
- Recorded: June 1991
- Studio: Capitol (Hollywood)
- Genre: Jazz fusion
- Length: 44:10
- Label: CMP
- Producer: Chad Wackerman, Walter Quintus, Kurt Renker

Chad Wackerman chronology
Forty Reasons (1991)	The View (1993)

Forty Reasons is the first studio album by drummer Chad Wackerman, released in 1991 through CMP Records; it was later reissued together with Wackerman's 1993 album The View as a limited edition double-disc compilation.

== Critical reception ==
Professional ratings
Review scores
Source	Rating
AllMusic	3/5 stars

AllMusic gave Forty Reasons three stars out of five, calling it "a tidy thesis of lessons well learned, a snazzy musical diary of 20 years of modern fusion surfeited with complex drumming, a multitude of elastic-time changes, and attractive, high-tech melodies." Praise was also given to each supporting musician—guitarist Allan Holdsworth, keyboardist Jim Cox and bassist Jimmy Johnson—for their "top-notch performances".

== Track listing ==
No.	Title	Music	Length
1.	"Holiday Insane"	Chad Wackerman	7:21
2.	"You Came Along"	Wackerman	4:10
3.	"Forty Reasons"	Wackerman, Carl Verheyen	7:47
4.	"Fearless"	Wackerman, Allan Holdsworth, Jim Cox, Jimmy Johnson	1:32
5.	"Quiet Life"	Wackerman	6:00
6.	"Waltzing on Jupiter"	Wackerman, Cox, Johnson	1:49
7.	"Tell Me"	Wackerman	5:16
8.	"House on Fire"	Wackerman, Holdsworth, Cox, Johnson	1:14
9.	"Hidden Places"	Wackerman	4:02
10.	"Go"	Wackerman, Holdsworth	1:40
11.	"Schemes"	Wackerman, Holdsworth, Cox, Johnson	3:19
Total length:			44:10

== Personnel ==
- Chad Wackerman – drums, production
- Allan Holdsworth – guitar
- Jim Cox – keyboard, piano, organ
- Jimmy Johnson – bass
- Walter Quintus – engineering, production
- Kurt Renker – production
