= The View (album) =

Studio album by Chad Wackerman
- Released: 1993
- Recorded: June 1993
- Studio: Capitol (Hollywood)
- Genre: Jazz fusion
- Length: 58:46
- Label: CMP
- Producer: Chad Wackerman, Walter Quintus, Kurt Renker

Chad Wackerman chronology
Forty Reasons (1991)	The View (1993)	Scream (2000)

The View is the second studio album by drummer Chad Wackerman, released in 1993 through CMP Records; it was later reissued together with Wackerman's 1991 album Forty Reasons as a limited edition double-disc compilation.

== Critical reception ==
Professional ratings
Review scores
Source	Rating
AllMusic	3/5 stars

Alex Henderson at AllMusic gave The View three stars out of five, calling it "worthwhile fusion [...] which falls short of remarkable but is a decent, respectable effort".

== Track listing ==
No.	Title	Music	Length
1.	"Close to Home"	Chad Wackerman	5:23
2.	"Across the Bridge"	Wackerman	5:44
3.	"Black Coffee"	Wackerman	5:57
4.	"Empty Suitcase"	Wackerman, Jim Cox, Jimmy Johnson, Allan Holdsworth, Walt Fowler	2:53
5.	"Introduction"	Wackerman	6:39
6.	"Starry Nights"	Wackerman	4:39
7.	"All Sevens"	Wackerman	8:13
8.	"On the Edge"	Wackerman, Cox, Johnson, Holdsworth	2:51
9.	"Just a Moment"	Holdsworth, Fowler	1:12
10.	"The View"	Wackerman, Carl Verheyen	5:06
11.	"Bash"	Wackerman	1:33
12.	"Flares"	Wackerman	5:26
13.	"Days Away"	Wackerman, Cox, Johnson, Holdsworth, Fowler	3:10
Total length:			58:46

== Personnel ==
- Chad Wackerman – drums, percussion, production
- Allan Holdsworth – guitar (tracks 1, 4, 5, 8, 9, 13)
- Carl Verheyen – guitar (tracks 2, 3, 6, 7, 10, 12)
- Jim Cox – clavinet, synthesizer, piano, organ
- Jimmy Johnson – bass
- Walt Fowler – trumpet, flugelhorn
- Walter Quintus – mixing, production
- Judy Clapp – engineering
- Kurt Renker – production
