= Slow Motion (Supertramp album) =

Studio album by Supertramp
- Released: 23 April 2002
- Studios: Sonora Recorders (Los Angeles, CA); The Backyard Studios (Hampton Bays, NY)
- Genre: Progressive rock
- Length: 50:07
- Labels: EMI; Silver Cab (U.S./Canada)
- Producers: Rick Davies, Mark Hart, Jay Messina

Supertramp chronology
Is Everybody Listening? (2001)	Slow Motion (2002)	Retrospectacle – The Supertramp Anthology (2005)

Slow Motion is the eleventh and final studio album by the British rock band Supertramp, released in April 2002.

== Overview ==
In North America, Slow Motion was only available via mail-order from the band's website, released on their own label.

The song "Goldrush" was actually written in the early 1970s under the first Supertramp line-up, by original guitarist Richard Palmer-James, and was used as the opening number in all their shows prior to Crime of the Century. The band had tried to record it on several previous occasions, but had never before been able to recreate it in the studio to their satisfaction. While the album credits the song to Davies and Palmer-James only, Roger Hodgson supposedly co-wrote it.

== Reception ==
Professional ratings
Review scores
Source	Rating
AllMusic	2.5/5 stars
The Rolling Stone Album Guide	1/5 stars

AllMusic praised the songs and diversity in styles, but criticized the production and runtime.

== Track listing ==
All tracks are written by Rick Davies, except where noted.

No.	Title	Length
1.	"Slow Motion"	3:50
2.	"Little By Little"	4:30
3.	"Broken Hearted"	4:28
4.	"Over You"	5:06
5.	"Tenth Avenue Breakdown"	8:57
6.	"A Sting in the Tail"	5:17
7.	"Bee in Your Bonnet"	6:27
8.	"Goldrush" (Davies and Richard Palmer-James)	3:06
9.	"Dead Man's Blues"	8:26
Total length:		50:07

== Personnel ==
Supertramp

- Rick Davies – keyboards, lead vocals, harmonica
- John Helliwell – saxophone, woodwinds
- Lee Thornburg – trumpet, backing vocals, trombone
- Carl Verheyen – guitars
- Mark Hart – keyboards, backing vocals, guitars
- Cliff Hugo – bass
- Bob Siebenberg – drums
- Jesse Siebenberg – percussion, backing vocals

=== Production ===
- Producers: Rick Davies, Mark Hart, Jay Messina
- Engineer: Jay Messina
- Mastering: Greg Calbi
- Pro-tools: Seth McClain
- Photography: Jean Ber, Richard Frankel

== Charts ==
=== Weekly charts ===
Chart (2002)	Position
Austrian Albums (Ö3 Austria)	18
Belgian Albums (Ultratop Wallonia)	31
Dutch Albums (Album Top 100)	83
French Albums (SNEP)	8
German Albums (Offizielle Top 100)	17
Italian Albums (FIMI)	46
Spanish Albums (AFYVE)	34
Swiss Albums (Schweizer Hitparade)	6

=== Year-end charts ===
Chart (2002)	Position
French Albums (SNEP)	118
Swiss Albums (Schweizer Hitparade)	88

== Certifications ==
Region	Certification	Certified units/sales
France (SNEP)	Gold	100,000^{*}
Switzerland (IFPI Switzerland)	Gold	20,000^{^}
^{*} Sales figures based on certification alone.^{^} Shipments figures based on certification alone.
