= Rosenshontz =

American children's music duo

- Genres: Children's music
- Years active: 1974–1993
- Labels: RS Records; Lightyear Entertainment
- Past members: Gary Rosen; Bill Shontz

Rosenshontz was a children's music duo popular in the U.S. in the 1970s and 1980s. Made up of Gary Rosen and Bill Shontz, the group recorded six albums between 1980 and 1991. Some of their more popular songs included "Share It", "Hugga, Hugga" and "The Best That I Can." By the early 1990s they had gone their separate ways and Rosen and Shontz went on to produce several solo albums. The Rosen Family and Bill Shontz continue to perform, albeit separately.

== History ==
Gary Rosen and Bill Shontz met in New York City in the early 1970s and formed the folk-flavored duo Rosenshontz in 1974. Modestly successful as a grown-up act, Rosenshontz got its big break when a kids' song the pair had written was featured on TV's Captain Kangaroo. Now children's entertainers, Rosen and Shontz moved to Brattleboro, Vermont, in 1977 and released their first album, Tickles You!, in 1980.

As their popularity grew, they moved from school concerts to larger family shows. Their version of "Teddy Bears' Picnic" was their first children's music hit. By 1983, the group was famous enough to play the Kennedy Center in Washington, D.C. Five more albums and several videos followed, but the early 1990s recession led to fewer bookings and they parted ways as a duo.

=== Later years ===
Going solo, Gary Rosen released his first solo album, Tot Rock, in 1993, followed by albums in 1996 and 1999. Twice during the Clinton years he performed at Easter concerts on the White House lawn. In 2004 Rosen announced he was battling Amyotrophic lateral sclerosis. He and his family continued to tour, taking center stage at Boston’s First Night celebration. Rosen and Shontz performed together for the final time on May 15, 2005, at a celebration of Gary's life and fundraiser. Gary Rosen died on April 14, 2007, at his Brattleboro, Vermont home.

Bill Shontz also released his first solo album, Animal Tales, in 1993, followed by albums in 1997 and 1998. He is on the New England Foundation for the Arts roster and serves as a spokesman for Earthwatch and Green Up Vermont. He founded and operates Children's Music Hall of Fame, a child-safe and family- and educator-friendly children's music website.

== Discography ==
- Tickles You! (RS Records, 1980)
- Share It! (RS Records, 1982)
- It's The Truth! (RS Records, 1984; reissued, Lightyear, 1992)
- Rock 'N Roll Teddy Bear (RS Records, 1986; reissued, Lightyear, 1992)
- Family Vacation (Lightyear Records, 1988)
- Uh-Oh! (Lightyear Records, 1991)
- Greatest Hits (Lightyear Entertainment, 1994)

Compilations:

- Quiet Time (Random House, 1990)
- Sing a Happy Song (Random House, 1990)
- Sing Along: featuring top children's stars with Rick Charette, Henry Cory, Janet & Judy, and Jonathan Sprout (Peter Pan, 1990)
- Stories to Remember and Rosenshontz with Phylicia Rashad and Judy Collins (Lightyear, 1993)
- Kids' Rock 'n Roll Party (Lightyear Entertainment, 2004)

=== Videography ===
- The Teddy Bears' Picnic (RS Records, 1986)
- The Feel Better Friends with Rosenshontz & Pandy (Golden Book Video, 1988)
- The Teddy Bears' Jamboree (Lightyear Video, 1993)

=== Solo albums ===
Gary Rosen:

- Tot Rock (Lightyear Records, 1993)
- Cookin' (GMR Records, 1996)
- Teddy Bear's Picnic (GMR Records, 1999)
- Pet Sounds (GMR Records, 2005)
- Gary Rosen Sings a.a. Milne (GMR Records, 2006)

Bill Shontz:

- Animal Tales (Lightyear Entertainment, 1993)
- Teddy Bear's Greatest Hits (Bearpaw Recordings, 1997)
- The day I read a book... (Bearpaw Recordings, 1998)

== Awards ==
- 1994: NAPPA Awards for Children's Music, Early Elementary Category, Rosenshontz Greatest Hits
