= Chad Wackerman =

American drummer (born 1960)

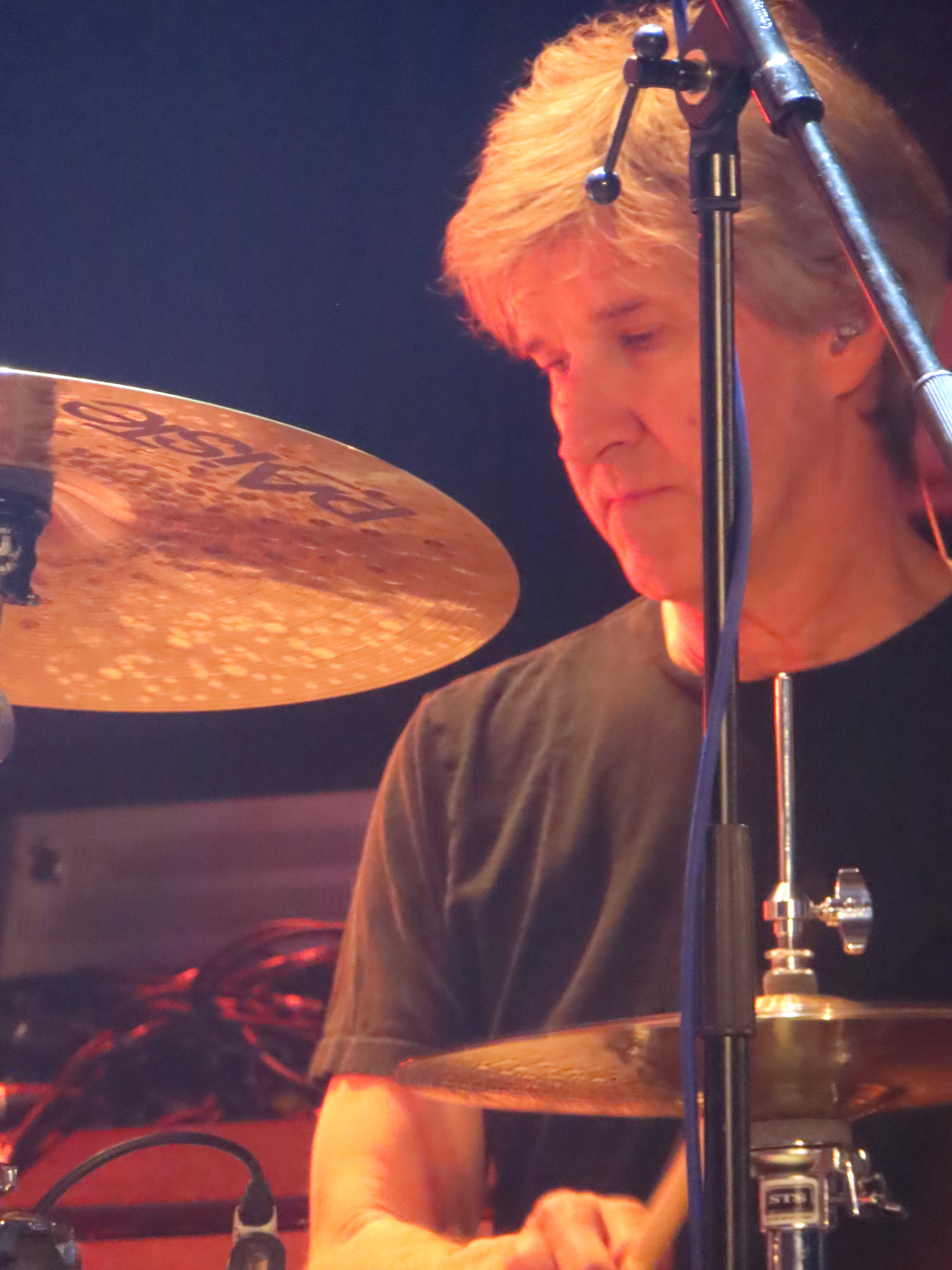
- Wackerman with Francis Dunnery in 2024

Background information
- Born: March 25, 1960 (age 66); Long Beach, California, U.S.
- Genres: Jazz fusion, jazz, rock
- Occupations: Musician, composer
- Instruments: Drums, percussion
- Years active: 1978–present
- Website: chadwackerman.com

Chad Wackerman (born March 25, 1960) is an American jazz, jazz fusion and rock drummer, who has played with Frank Zappa and Allan Holdsworth. He has worked as a band member, session musician, sideman, and bandleader. He is the older brother of drummers John Wackerman and Brooks Wackerman, and the father of singer and songwriter Sophia James.

== Musical career ==
Wackerman was raised in Seal Beach, California, in a family immersed in music. His father, Chuck Wackerman (1930-2022), was a drummer and music teacher specializing in jazz who taught at both high school and middle school levels. His brothers, John and Brooks, are also proficient drummers and multi-instrumentalists. John recorded an album titled Drum Duets Vol.1. Among his influences, he has cited Jeff Porcaro, Ed Greene, Bernard Purdie, Stewart Copeland, Terry Bozzio, Vinnie Colaiuta, Steve Gadd, Peter Erskine, Tony Williams, Elvin Jones, Bob Moses, Jack DeJohnette, Bobby Colomby, John Von Ohlen, Buddy Rich, and Louie Bellson as his main ones.

Wackerman joined the Bill Watrous band in 1978 and then worked with Frank Zappa from 1981 to 1988. Zappa demanded high musical standards and imposed exacting discipline in rehearsal and on tour. The auditions for his band were "grueling", according to Steve Vai and Wackerman himself. Two pieces of music, "Mo 'n Herb's Vacation", and "The Black Page" were considered exceptionally difficult. Only three drummers throughout Zappa's career were able to play them successfully: Wackerman, Terry Bozzio, and Vinnie Colaiuta. In an interview with Drum Magazine, Bozzio noted that although he and Colaiuta gained more notoriety from playing with Zappa, Wackerman performed Zappa's most challenging material.

In addition to appearing on Zappa's rock albums and tours, Wackerman performed with the London Symphony Orchestra in 1983 on a concert and recording session of Zappa's compositions.

== Sideman and session musician ==
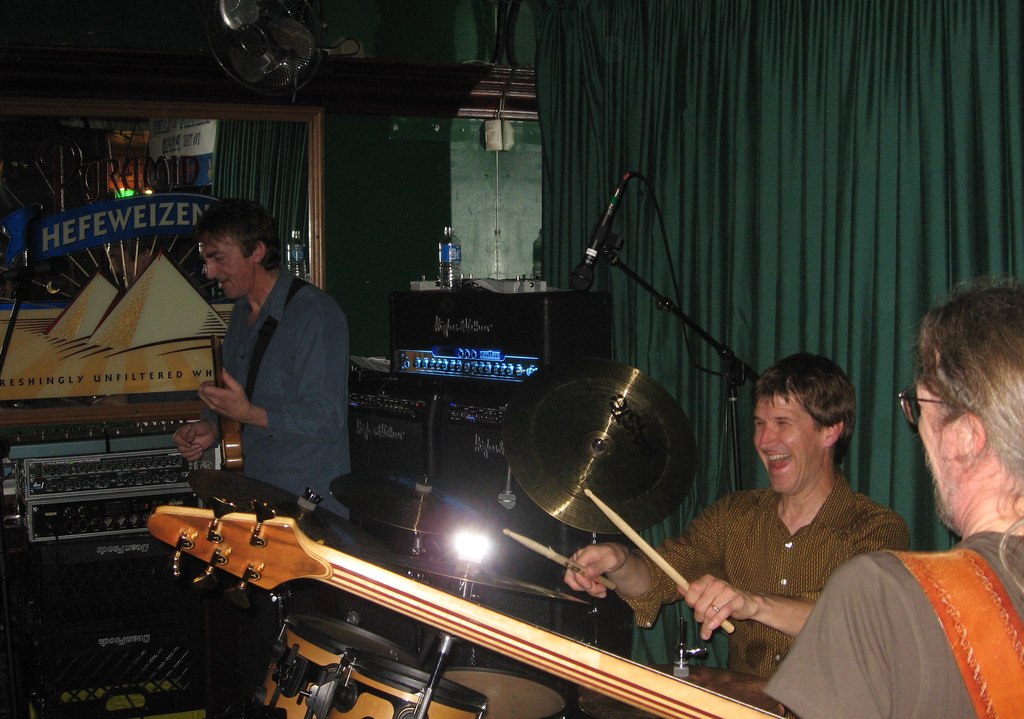
Wackerman (center) with Allan Holdsworth and Jimmy Johnson in 2006

In 1985, Wackerman toured with, but did not record for, Australian rock act Men at Work. He played on the album and supporting video One Voice with Barbra Streisand. He has also recorded albums and toured with diverse artists such as Allan Holdsworth, Steve Vai, Andy Summers, Ed Mann, Albert Lee, Colin Hay, Ed Kuepper, Dweezil Zappa and Tom Grant. Wackerman was also the drummer for the house band on the first Dennis Miller late-night talk show.

Wackerman has also toured with James Taylor, Mark Linn-Baker and Larry Sweeney, John Patitucci, Jeff Lorber, and Joe Sample, as well as fellow Zappa drummer Terry Bozzio in a series of all-percussion concerts. Wackerman lived in Australia for ten years between 1995 and 2005 but moved back to California in July 2005.

Replacing drummer Marco Minnemann, Wackerman toured with Steven Wilson's band through 2013 in support of Wilson's album The Raven That Refused to Sing. He performed on the song "Happy Returns" from Wilson's 2015 album Hand. Cannot. Erase.

== Chad Wackerman Trio & All Stars ==
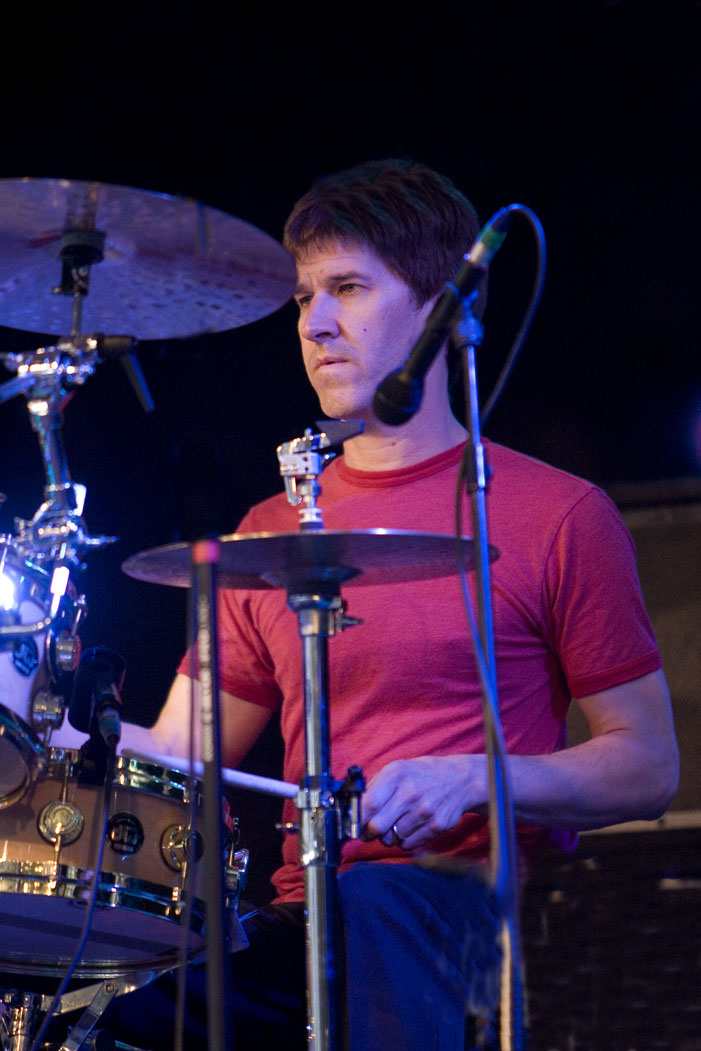
Wackerman in 2007

The latest version of the Chad Wackerman Trio consisted of Wackerman (drums), Doug Lunn (1954–2017; bass), and Mike Miller (guitar). Wackerman's solo albums include guitar contributions from Allan Holdsworth.

As per 2026 he tours with the LA All Stars, who all are more or less connected to Holdsworth.

Line up: Chad Wackerman drums, Alex Machacek guitar, Jimmy Haslip bass, Steve Hunt keyboards.

== Discography ==
- Forty Reasons (1991)
- The View (1993)
- Scream (2000)
- Legs Eleven (2004)
- Dreams Nightmares and Improvisations (2012)
