= Is Everybody Listening? =

Live album by Supertramp
- Released: 6 November 2001
- Recorded: 9 March 1975
- Venues: Hammersmith Odeon (London, UK)
- Genres: Progressive rock, art rock
- Length: 74:57
- Label: Pilot/Big Daddy

Supertramp chronology
It Was the Best of Times (1999)	Is Everybody Listening? (2001)	Slow Motion (2002)

Is Everybody Listening? is a live album by the British rock band Supertramp, released in November 2001.

== Overview ==
Is Everybody Listening? is credited as being the 1976 recording of a concert that took place in Cleveland, Ohio. In fact, the actual concert took place on 9 March 1975 at London's Hammersmith Odeon during the Crime of the Century tour (as John Helliwell confirmed on his website).

Is Everybody Listening? features the entire Crime of the Century album while some tracks from the then still-to-be-recorded Crisis? What Crisis? album make up the middle third of the concert.

This recording was previously released as a bootleg prior to this release.

The mastering engineer Ray Staff has remastered this album as a part of the Crime of the Century Deluxe Edition 2CD-format reissue on 9 December 2014.

== Track listing ==
All tracks are written by Rick Davies and Roger Hodgson.

No.	Title	Lead vocals	Length
1.	"School"	Hodgson and Davies	6:17
2.	"Bloody Well Right"	Davies	6:50
3.	"Hide in Your Shell"	Hodgson	6:52
4.	"Asylum"	Davies and Hodgson	7:05
5.	"Sister Moonshine"	Hodgson and Davies	5:21
6.	"Just a Normal Day"	Davies and Hodgson	4:09
7.	"Another Man's Woman"	Davies	7:47
8.	"Lady"	Hodgson	8:58
9.	"Dreamer"	Hodgson and Davies	3:30
10.	"Rudy"	Davies and Hodgson	7:25
11.	"If Everyone Was Listening"	Hodgson	4:35
12.	"Crime of the Century"	Davies	6:08
Total length:			74:57

== Personnel ==
- Rick Davies – piano, keyboards, harmonica, vocals
- Roger Hodgson – guitar, electric piano, keyboards, vocals
- John Helliwell – saxophone, clarinet, keyboards, vocals
- Dougie Thomson – bass, additional backing vocals
- Bob Siebenberg – drums

== Production ==
- Project coordinator: Carlton P. Sandercock
- Design: Christian Thompson
- Photography: Christian Thompson, Rick Walton
- Illustrations: Christian Thompson
- Liner notes: John Kirkman
