= Shawn Amos =

American musician (born 1967)

Shawn Ellis Amos
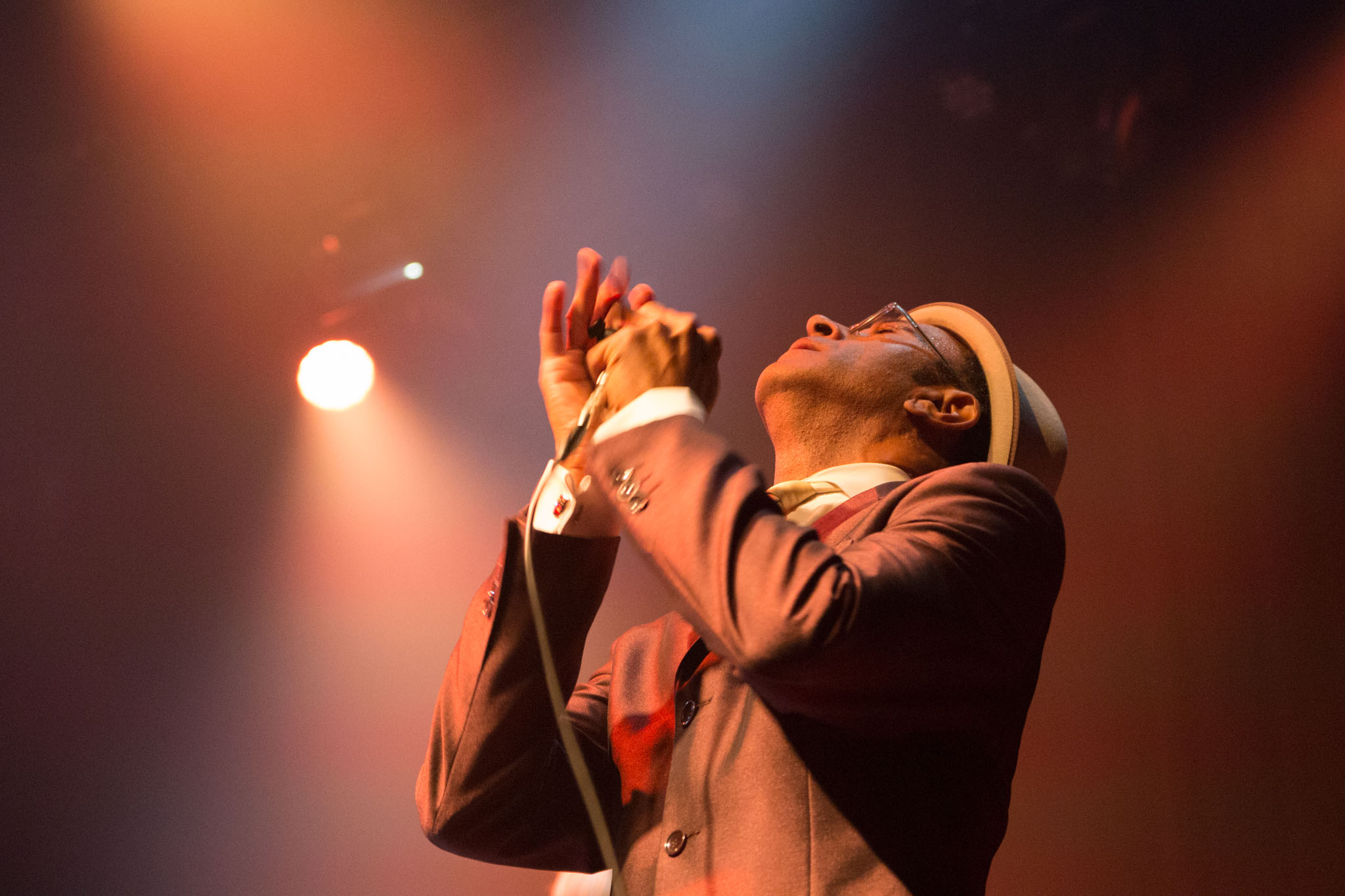
- Amos at the Ramblin' Roots festival in Utrecht

Background information
- Also known as: The Reverend Shawn Amos
- Born: September 13, 1967 (age 59); New York, New York, U.S.
- Genres: Blues, roots, Americana, folk
- Occupations: Musician, songwriter, singer, writer, entrepreneur, record producer
- Instruments: Vocals, harmonica, guitar
- Years active: 1990s–present
- Labels: Rhino, Shout! Factory, Put Together Music
- Website: shawnamos.com

Shawn Ellis Amos (born September 13, 1967) is an American songwriter, author, blues singer, record producer and digital marketing entrepreneur.

Amos is best known as blues singer and harmonica player, "The Reverend Shawn Amos." He has released multiple studio, live, single and extended-play titles under the moniker.

== Personal background ==
Amos was born in New York. He is the youngest son of Famous Amos chocolate chip cookie founder Wally Amos and the only son of Shirley Ellis Amos (professionally known as Shirl-ee May in the early 1960s). Throughout Amos' childhood and adulthood, his mother suffered from schizoaffective disorder and ultimately died by suicide in 2003. The trauma of the event and his subsequent discovery of her early singing career were the inspiration behind his 2005 album release Thank You Shirl-ee May.

Like his father, Amos worked in the William Morris Agency mailroom. Amos attended New York University Tisch School of the Arts. He left in the middle of his senior year to pursue a "first-look" deal with A&M Films as a screenwriter. In 2011, The Huffington Post published a four-part series chronicling his childhood in 1970s Los Angeles.

Amos married actress Marta Martin in 1999. The couple divorced in 2018. They have three children. Amos' half-sister, Sarah Amos, is an executive at Marvel Entertainment.

== Musical career ==
=== Americana (1996–2001) ===
Amos was hired at Rhino Entertainment's A&R department 1997 by department head, Gary Stewart. While at the reissue label, Amos produced multiple compilations, including the Grammy-nominated historical box set Rhapsodies in Black: Music and Words from the Harlem Renaissance. While employed at Rhino Entertainment, he began work on his first album, Harlem, which was first released by Unbreakable Records in 2000. The album was titled Harlem after being inspired by a museum exhibit dedicated to the Harlem Renaissance.

In 2001, Amos produced Quincy Jones' career overview Q: The Musical Biography of Quincy Jones. Jones subsequently asked Amos to run his Listen Up Foundation as executive director. The same year, he released his second original album, In Between, again on Unbreakable Records.

=== Compilation and record producer (2002–2006) ===
In 2003, Amos was recruited by Rhino co-founders Richard Foos, Garson Foos and Bob Emmer to oversee the A&R department of their newly formed entertainment company, Shout! Factory.

During 2005-06, Amos conceived and co-produced a remake of the 1971 Marvin Gaye album What's Going On, performed by the Dirty Dozen Brass Band; conceived and executive produced a remix album of Herb Alpert & the Tijuana Brass' Whipped Cream and Other Delights. He joined with Alpert and Ozomatli for a performance of "Love Potion No. 9" on The Tonight Show with Jay Leno in March 2006.

Amos oversaw Solomon Burke's last three studio albums, Make Do With What You Got, Nashville, and Like a Fire. He also oversaw the first two volumes of cover albums by Matthew Sweet and Susanna Hoff, Under the Covers.

=== Thank You Shirl-ee May (2005–2007) ===
In 2005, Shout! Factory released his third studio album, Thank You Shirl-ee May. With this release, Amos chronicles the career of his mother, a club singer in the 1960s. Shawn discovered his mother's professional life as Shirl-ee May only after her suicide in July 2003. Amos says album is a tender tribute to his mother, Shirlee Ellis Amos. Songs like " "New York City 1964" and "The Bottle Always Brings Me Down" explore the life of the singer known as Shir-lee May.

In 2007, Amos performed on and produced the Solomon Burke & Friends: Live in Nashville televised concert. His song "Vicious Circle" from Harlem was sung by label mate Solomon Burke.

=== The Reverend Shawn Amos (2014–present) ===
After a hiatus where he focused on ventures in digital marketing, Amos returned to roots music with the 2014 release of The Reverend Shawn Amos Tells It, released by the label Put Together Music. He followed this in 2015 with the release of his fifth album, The Reverend Shawn Amos Loves You, again released by Put Together and produced by jazz saxophonist, Mindi Abair. He followed with the politically-themed, The Reverend Shawn Amos Breaks It Down, released in 2018.

Amos produced and starred in the YouTube series, Kitchen Table Blues which ran for 90 episodes from 2015-2016. Select song performances from the series were released as two EPs in 2019. In 2016, Amos played harmonica for the main title of the Seth Rogen-produced AMC series, Preacher. Amos was named Artistic Director for Herb Alpert's Los Angeles jazz club, Herb Alpert's Vibrato Grill & Jazz in 2017. He resigned from the position in 2018 to focus on touring activity.

Amos has curated the jazz & blues series, blackbox, for the 2018–19 and 2019-20 seasons of the Broad Stage in Santa Monica, California.

On September 4, 2019, Amos posted a video on his YouTube channel announcing the formation of a new band, The Brotherhood, with drummer, Brady Blade, bassist Christopher Thomas and longtime guitarist, Chris “Doctor” Roberts.

=== The Reverend Shawn Amos & The Brotherhood (2020–present) ===
Amos and The Brotherhood released their debut album, Blue Sky, on April 17, 2020.

The album features Ruthie Foster and Kenya Hathaway (daughter of late soul singer, Donny Hathaway). Blue Sky debuted on the Billboard Blues Album Chart at number 6. American Songwriter magazine gave the album 4 of 5 stars, calling it, “so rousing it outshines his earlier output like never before.” Blue Sky peaked at #36 on the Americana Music Association Radio Chart.

== Professional career ==
=== Digital marketing (2009–present) ===
On November 4, 2009, Amos announced the formation of his own company, Amos Content Group, to develop content for digital media and traditional companies. In August 2012, The New York Times announced that Amos Content Group was jointly acquired by public relations company FleishmanHillard and GMR Marketing and rebranded as Freshwire.

In October 2012, Amos was named one of Forbes "Up and Comers." Amos has moderated or spoken at several notable industry panels, including the Milken Institute, the Thread Summit in Colorado, Las Vegas' CES Convention, TEDxEast, and "OMD Predicts" in Dubai, an event for EMEA marketing leaders.

In 2015, Freshwire officially became FleishmanHillard ContentWorks, and Amos was named Chief Content Innovation Officer of the Americas.

Amos left FleishmanHilard in 2016 and launched a new venture, Put Together Media. In 2017, Amos merged Put Together Media with New York communications firm, Hudson Cutler.

=== Author ===
Publishers Weekly announced on June 20, 2020 that book publisher, Little Brown and Company, acquired Amos' debut novel, Cookies & Milk, for six figures. The book is scheduled for Spring 2022 publication.

Deadline Hollywood announced on May 5, 2022 that Disney Branded Television will bring Shawn Amos' debut novel Cookies & Milk to screen with an animated series, currently in development. The project is being produced by Laurence Fishburne and Helen Sugland of Cinema Gypsy Productions (black-ish), Jesse Murphy and James Sears Bryant of Jesse James Films, and Amos.

On January 12, 2023, Cookies & Milk was nominated to the Outstanding Literary Work - Youth/Teens category at the 54th NAACP Image Awards.

== Production and other credits ==
AllMusic has a list of Amos's work.
