= Carl Verheyen =

American guitarist (born 1954)

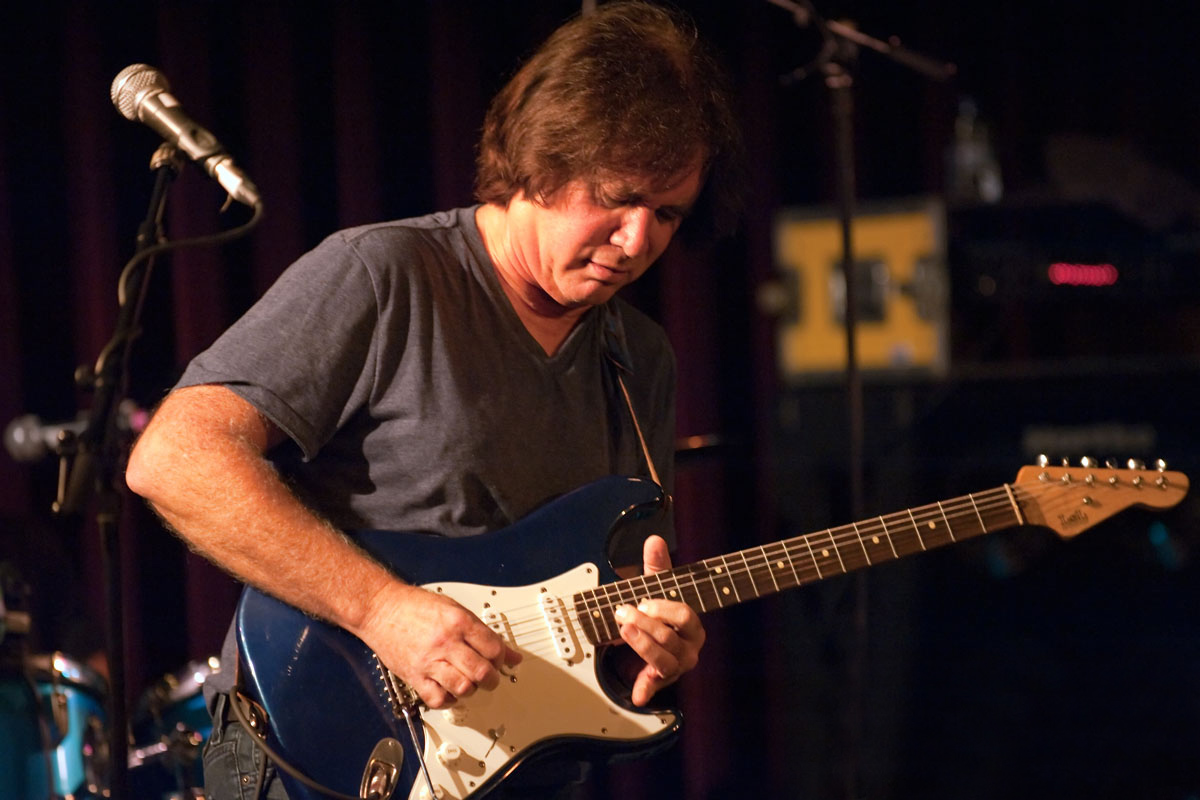
- Verheyen in 2009

Background information
- Born: Carl William Verheyen; April 3, 1954 (age 72); Santa Monica, California, U.S.
- Genres: Rock, instrumental rock, jazz fusion, blues, country music
- Occupation: Musician
- Instrument: Guitar
- Years active: 1969–present
- Labels: CMG, Mascot/Provogue, AIX, Cranktone Entertainment, Peppercake
- Formerly of: Supertramp; Carl Verheyen Band
- Website: carlverheyen.com

Carl William Verheyen (born April 3, 1954) is an American musician best known for being the guitarist of Supertramp, the leader of the Carl Verheyen Band, and as a Los Angeles session guitarist. He was ranked One of the World's Top 10 Guitarists by Guitar Magazine and won the LA Music Awards category of Best Guitarist at their 6th annual awards ceremony. He has recorded with such artists as The Bee Gees, Chad Wackerman, Dolly Parton, Victor Feldman, Richard Elliot, and Stanley Clarke and has played guitar on film soundtracks including The Crow (1994), The Usual Suspects, Ratatouille, and Mission: Impossible – Ghost Protocol, and TV shows Cheers, Seinfeld, and Scrubs.

He has been an adjunct instructor of studio jazz guitar for the USC Thornton School of Music and makes frequent instructional performances at the Musicians Institute (MI) in Hollywood, California, Guitar Institute of Technology and has authored instructional books including Improvising Without Scales, as well as Studio City, a collection of articles written for the magazine Guitar for the Practicing Musician

== Career ==
=== Supertramp ===
In 1985, Verheyen was hired as a session guitarist on a recording project at Wildcat Studios in Los Angeles. He exchanged phone numbers with the recording engineer who passed along his contact information to Supertramp's management after learning that the band was currently auditioning guitarists. Verheyen auditioned for the band the next day and was hired as a sideman and toured with the band on their 1985–1986 world tour, Brother Where You Bound.

In 1996, Rick Davies re-formed Supertramp adding Verheyen as a formal band member along with three other new members bringing the band up to an eight-man line-up. The result of this reunion was Some Things Never Change, a new studio album released in March 1997 that echoed the earlier Supertramp sound and reached number 74 in the UK In the summer of 1997, Supertramp returned to the road, resulting in the live It Was the Best of Times (1999).

After a three-year hiatus, Verheyen performed on the band's 2002 new studio album entitled Slow Motion, as well as performing on the 2002 world tour entitled, One More for the Road Tour.

He performed in 35 concerts with the band in late 2010 and 2011 in Europe. The tour was titled 70–10 (1970 to 2010) to commemorate the 40th anniversary of the group's first release.

=== The Carl Verheyen Band ===
In 1987 the Carl Verheyen Band was founded although the first release titled No Border was released under the name Carl Verheyen Group on CMG Records.

==== 1990s ====
The follow-up album, 1994's Garage Sale, was initially released on Legato Records along with an expanded version of No Borders called No Borders Plus. By 1996 the CVB had moved to CMG Mighty Tiger Records and released Slang Justice featuring bassist Dave Marotta and keyboardist Jim Cox. The record was simultaneously released in Europe on the Provogue label and the CVB began touring in Europe extensively and continues to do so to the present day. The fourth album entitled Slingshot was written on the road with Supertramp on the 1997 Some Things Never Change Tour. Released in 1999 it featured drummers Steve DiStanislao, John Ferraro and Gregg Bissonette. Fellow Supertramp members Mark Hart sang background vocals and Cliff Hugo played bass.

==== 2000s ====
Verheyen released the trio recording Atlas Overload in 2000 with bassist Cliff Hugo and drummer Steve DiStanislao. In 2001 a solo album titled Solo Guitar Improvisations was released featuring the acoustic side of Verheyen's guitar playing. And later that year a jazz fusion project called Real to Reel was released featuring Karl Ratzer on guitar.

SIX recorded with Hugo and DiStanislao along with Jim Cox on Hammond B-3 and Wurlitzer piano was released in 2004. Bernie Dresel replaced DeStanislao on drums for the 2005 release Rumor Mill. The live record was recorded by AIX Records in LA's Zipper Hall and featured a 5.1 surround mix and a DVD of the concert. It won the award for Best Additional Features at the Surround Sound Awards that year. The European version on Mascot/Provogue is called Live in LA and was released separately as a CD and a DVD." In 2007 the CVB released "Take One Step". Chad Wackerman and Bernie Dresel share the drum duties with Jim Cox on keyboards and Cliff Hugo on bass. AIX released the CD along with a making-of DVD showing the band in the studio and on tour.

In 2009, Walfredo Reyes Jr. joined the CVB along with Dave Marotta on bass and Jim Cox on keyboards they released Trading 8s featuring six of Verheyen's guitar playing friends: Robben Ford, Albert Lee, Joe Bonamassa, Steve Morse, Rick Vito and Scott Henderson. The subsequent tour produced the double live album and DVD called The Road Divides released in 2011.

==== 2010s ====
In 2013, Verheyen released Mustang Run, a mostly instrumental record with one vocal track, Supertramp's classic Bloody Well Right. Musicians included Simon Phillips, Greg Bissonette, Chad Wackerman and Walfredo Reyes Jr. on drums with Supertramp's John Helliwell and solo artist Bill Evans on sax. Jerry Goodman plays violin and Jimmy Johnson, Dave Marotta and Stuart Hamm share the bass duties. Keyboard players include Jim Cox and Mitchel Forman.

A movie called Turn It Up - A Celebration of the Electric Guitar featuring Verheyen extensively, was released in 2014. Then in 2015 Verheyen released another solo acoustic recording called Alone: Solo Guitar Improvisations, Volume 2.

In 2016, the CVB added drummer John Mader and recorded The Grand Design at Sweetwater Studios in Fort Wayne, Indiana. Stuart Hamm joins Dave Marotta on bass and Chester Thompson adds drums on one track. A documentary movie was made of the creative and recording process called Grand Designs: The Music of Carl Verheyen. It won the Special Jury Remi Award at the 2017 Worldfest Film Festival.

Verheyen returned to Sweetwater Studios to record Essential Blues in 2018 with drummer Nick D'Virgilio and bassist Dave Martin. The live studio record also featured Jim Cox and was completed in two days. It was the first recording also released on vinyl since 1987's No Borders.

Classic Rock Magazine in the UK called Verheyen "One of the Top 100 Guitarists of all time" and Guitar Magazine in the US called him one of the top 10 guitarists in the World.

==== 2020s ====
In 2021, he released a new studio album called Sundial. It features Dave Marotta, John Mader and Jim Cox, as well as contributions by Nick D'Virgilio and Chad Wackerman. In 2023, Verheyen released the studio album, Riverboat Sky (featuring vocalist Sophia James on the title track), followed by his 2026 album release, Promised Future, recorded with his touring band members, Troy Dexter, Dave Marotta, John Mader and Hollye Dexter.

== Discography ==
Year	Artist	Album	Credit
1988	Carl Verheyen Group	No Borders	
1994	Carl Verheyen	Garage Sale	
1996	Carl Verheyen	Slang Justice	
1998	Carl Verheyen	Slingshot	
2000	Carl Verheyen	Atlas Overload	
2001	Carl Verheyen	Solo Guitar Improvisations	
2001	Carl Verheyen & Karl Ratzer	Real To Reel	
2003	Carl Verheyen Band	Six	
2005	Carl Verheyen Band	Live in L.A.	
2005	Carl Verheyen Band	Rumor Mill	
2007	Carl Verheyen Band	Take One Step	
2009	Carl Verheyen Band	Trading 8s	
2011	Carl Verheyen Band	The Road Divides (Double Live CD)	
2013	Carl Verheyen	Mustang Run	
2015	Carl Verheyen	Alone: Solo Guitar Improvisations, Volume 2	
2016	Carl Verheyen	The Grand Design	
2018	Carl Verheyen	Essential Blues	
2021	Carl Verheyen	Sundial	
2023	Carl Verheyen	Riverboat Sky	
2026	Carl Verheyen	Promised Future	

== Videography ==
Year	Artist	Album	Credit
2011	Carl Verheyen Band	The Road Divides	
