= Cliff Hugo =

Musical artist (born 1951)

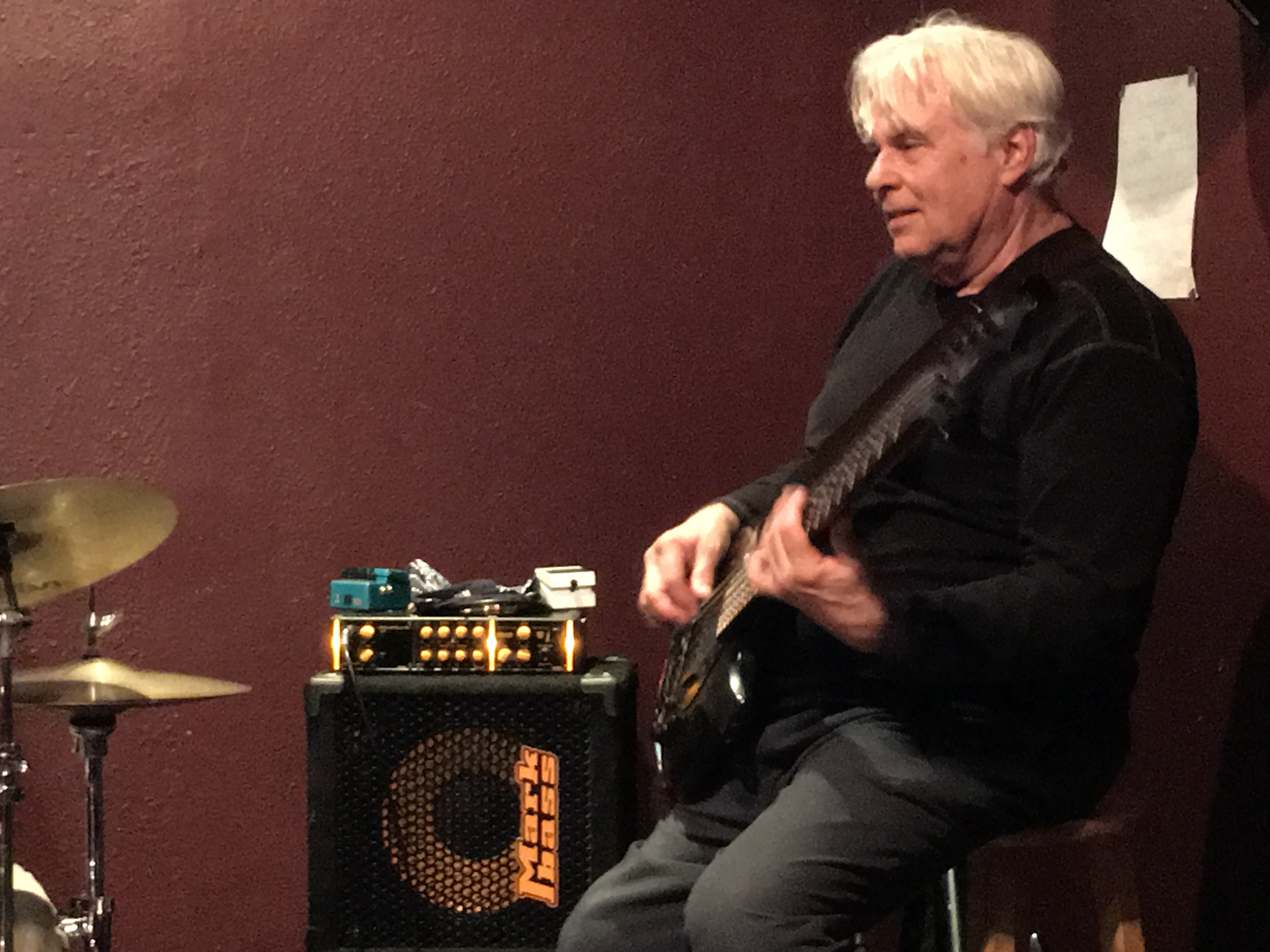
- Hugo performing in 2017

Background information
- Born: April 23, 1951 (age 74)
- Genres: Progressive rock, art rock, Jazz
- Occupation(s): Musician, bassist
- Instrument: Bass guitar- upright Bass

Clifford Clyde Hugo (born April 23, 1951 in Glendale, California), was the bass guitarist for the progressive rock band Supertramp after long-time member Dougie Thomson left in 1988.

== Biography ==
After college, he has toured the world as a member of the Ray Charles band. Hugo worked with fellow Supertramp member Carl Verheyen in the Carl Verheyen Band from '97 - 2008. Hugo has worked as a session musician for other musical projects and artists, like Melissa Manchester, Solomon Burke, Willie Bobo, Paul Williams, Richard Elliot, Dan Hicks, Chris O'Connel, Rick Braun and Manhattan Transfer. He worked with Mel Martin, Peppino D’ Agostino and former US Navy SEAL singer songwriter harmonica player Curt Campbell’s The Eclectic Beast Band’s “Liquid Smoke” Album released in 2018.

In 2012, Hugo appeared on The Beach Boys' reunion album, That's Why God Made the Radio.
