= KCBI =

KCBI may refer to:

- KCBI (AM), a radio station (770 AM) licensed to serve Garland, Texas, United States
- KCBI-FM, a radio station (90.9 FM) licensed to serve Dallas, Texas
- KNON, a radio station (89.3 FM) licensed to serve Dallas, Texas, which used the call signs KCBI and KCBI-FM from 1974 to 1988
