= First Baptist Church Dallas =

House of worship in Texas, US

First Baptist Church
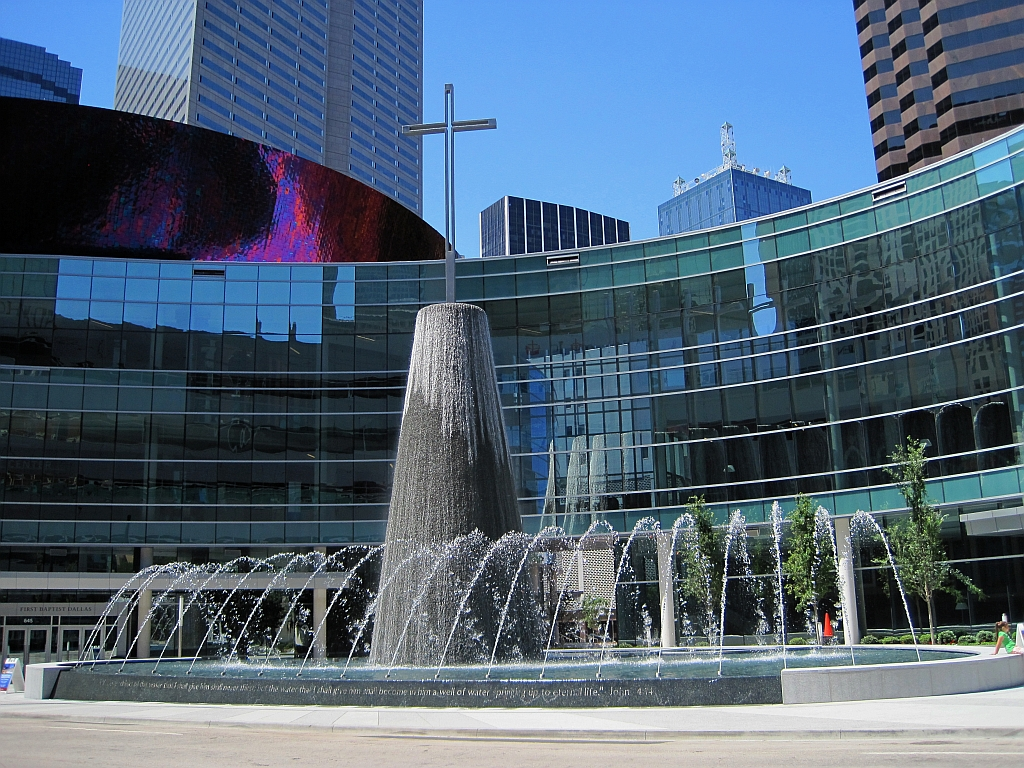
- Main building

- Location within Texas Location within the United States
- 32°47′5″N 96°47′58″W
- Location: 1707 San Jacinto St., Dallas, Texas
- Country: United States
- Denomination: Baptist
- Website: www.firstdallas.org

History
- Founded: July 30, 1868

Architecture
- Heritage designation: Recorded Texas Historic Landmark #6689
- Designated: 1968

Administration
- Division: Southern Baptists of Texas Convention

Clergy
- Pastor(s): Robert Jeffress, since 2007

First Baptist Dallas is a Baptist megachurch located in Dallas, Texas. The church was established in 1868; it is affiliated with the SBC (Southern Baptist Convention). The Downtown Dallas Church is historically considered influential as a denominational leader among Protestant Churches in the United States, serving as a successful model through its involvement of several legacy community missions.

The First Baptist Church of Dallas founded many former affiliating and existing ministries—from Silent Friends to First Baptist Academy to Criswell College, KCBI to Dallas Life, amongst other legacy ministries.

The current pastor is Dr. Robert Jeffress (2007), appointed only after Pastor Mac Brunson (1999), who succeeded Pastor O.S. Hawkins (1993), who then succeeded Pastor Joel C. Gregory (1990). The preceding pastors before Dr. Joel C. Gregory were Dr. W. A. Criswell (1944) and Dr. George Washington Truett (1897).

== History ==
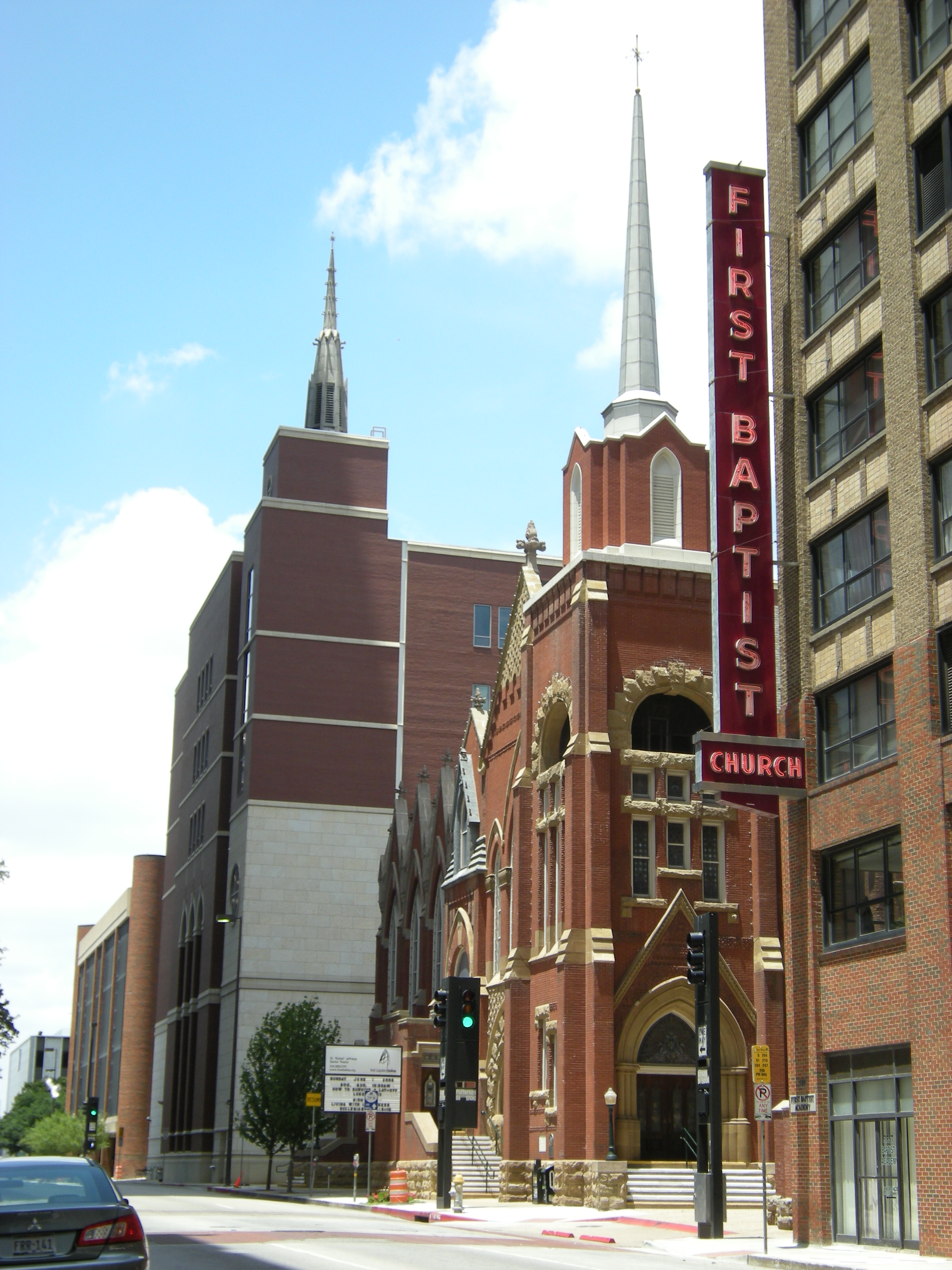
Historic building

The First Baptist Church of Dallas was established on July 30, 1868, with eleven founding members. They convened in the Masonic Hall, located on Lamar Street near Ross Avenue. In 1872, the congregation pooled their funds to purchase the first building, on Akard, in downtown Dallas. The cornerstone of the sanctuary that the congregation worships in today was laid in 1891.

Since the 1970s, the church has established a number of ministries that are affiliated with the church. First Baptist Academy of Dallas and Criswell College (formerly Criswell Bible Institute) were formed to champion Christian education. In the mid-1970s, Criswell College purchased KCBI to be used as a Christian radio station. The station has resided on the lower frequencies of FM. Now at 90.9 FM, KCBI broadcasts as part of the Criswell Radio Network, and includes KCCE and KSAO of San Angelo, Texas, and KCBK of Frederick, Oklahoma.

In 2013, Ted Cruz, invited by Robert Jeffress, attended the church and gave a speech to the congregation on faith and the Constitution of the United States. Jeffress praised Cruz as "a strong leader and a committed Christian".

In 2013, a 3,000-seat Worship Center and expansion was built close to the historic building at a cost of $130 million. The center has 178,000 square feet (16,500 m^{2}) of space, and the older facilities were renovated.

In 2018, the church claimed 13,000 members.

== Facilities ==
In 2013, by virtue of the Truett and Criswell Pastorships, First Baptist Dallas completed a major renovation and expansion of their facilities, including construction of a new worship center. At a cost of $130,000,000 it is the most expensive Protestant building project in modern history. In 2019 they announced another $35,000,000 expansion to the Horner Family Center and the addition of a new parking garage, growing the Family Center to 179,000 square feet from an original 98,500 square footage.

FBC Dallas has a 3,000-seat worship center and a large skywalk. It contains computer-synchronized water fountain playing music. Despite demolition of a large portion of their six-block campus, First Baptist retains the original worship center as an ancillary venue for worship services, weddings and other events.

On July 19, 2024, the historic sanctuary partially collapsed after catching on fire. The cause of the fire has yet to be determined. Officials have said no one was injured in the fire.

== Senior pastors ==
W. W. Harris was the first pastor. In 1897, George Washington Truett accepted the position of Pastor and remained there until his death in July 1944. In 1944, Dr. W. A. Criswell became the pastor. During his pastorate, the church expanded to multiple buildings covering five blocks in Downtown Dallas, eventually becoming the largest Southern Baptist church in the world. Dr. Criswell became Pastor Emeritus from 1995 until his death in 2002. In 1990, Joel C. Gregory became pastor, followed by O. S. Hawkins in 1993, Mac Brunson in 1999, and Robert Jeffress in 2007.

=== W. A. Criswell ===
Pastor W. A. Criswell never spoke in support of racial segregation in his sermons but was critical of the Supreme Court's decision in Brown v. Board of Education and of federal intervention against de jure southern segregation. In 1956 he made an address denouncing forced integration to a South Carolina evangelism conference. A day later, he addressed the South Carolina legislature remarking that he "strongly favored racial segregation" and charged that those who were attempting to integrate the white church were "infidels, dying from the neck up." He was particularly critical of the National Council of Churches and the National Association for the Advancement of Colored People (NAACP). After his 1968 election as president of the Southern Baptist Convention, he said that his church already had many non-white members and was open to all regardless of race. In 1970, he remarked that he had "come to the profound conclusion that to separate by coercion the body of Christ on the basis of skin pigmentation was unthinkable, unchristian and unacceptable to God". He asserted publicly, "I don't think that segregation could have been or was at any time intelligently, seriously supported by the Bible.

In September 1992, after two years of pastoring, senior pastor Joel C. Gregory resigned, saying it was due to the refusal of Pastor W. A. Criswell to relinquish control of the church, despite Gregory being the senior pastor de jure. In 1994, Gregory published his book "Too Great a Temptation: The Seductive Power of America's Super Church", detailing his reasons for leaving.

=== Robert Jeffress ===
Since 2008, Pastor Robert Jeffress has been involved in numerous controversies, including hate speech against homosexuals, Muslims, Catholics, Mormons and president Barack Obama.

In November 2008, Jeffress, in his sermon "Gay Is Not OK", stated that "What they [homosexuals] do is filthy. It is so degrading that it is beyond description. And it is their filthy behavior that explains why they are so much more prone to disease."

In September 2010, Pastor Jeffress branded Islam as an "evil, evil religion", claiming that it "promoted pedophilia". In December 2010, Jeffress established a "Naughty and Nice List", identifying businesses based on whether or not they openly celebrated Christmas, saying "I wanted to do something positive to encourage businesses to acknowledge Christmas and not bow to the strident voices of a minority who object to the holiday."

Also in 2010, he referred to Roman Catholicism as a "Satanic" result of "Babylonian mystery religion".

In October 2011 at the Values Voter Summit, Jeffress branded the Church of Jesus Christ of Latter-day Saints (LDS Church) "a cult". He received widespread criticism but he has not retracted, despite then U.S. presidential candidate and LDS church member Mitt Romney requesting that he do so.

On November 4, 2012, the Sunday before the 2012 election, Jeffress said that Barack Obama was "paving the way for the future reign of the Antichrist."

In June 2015, he compared the "marginalization" of Christians in the United States with Jews under Nazi Germany. Rabbi Jack Moline of the Interfaith Alliance accused him of being disrespectful to victims of the Holocaust.

== Notable members ==
American evangelist Rev. Billy Graham became a member of the First Baptist Church of Dallas in 1953 while visiting Dallas during his crusade to the area and remained a church member for over fifty years, despite not residing within the Dallas area and only very infrequently visiting the Dallas church. In December 2008, the 90-year-old Graham switched his church membership to First Baptist Church of Spartanburg, South Carolina, closer to his residence in North Carolina.

== See also ==
- Recorded Texas Historic Landmarks in Dallas County
