= Robert Jeffress =

Pastor of First Baptist Church of Dallas, Texas

The Reverend Robert Jeffress
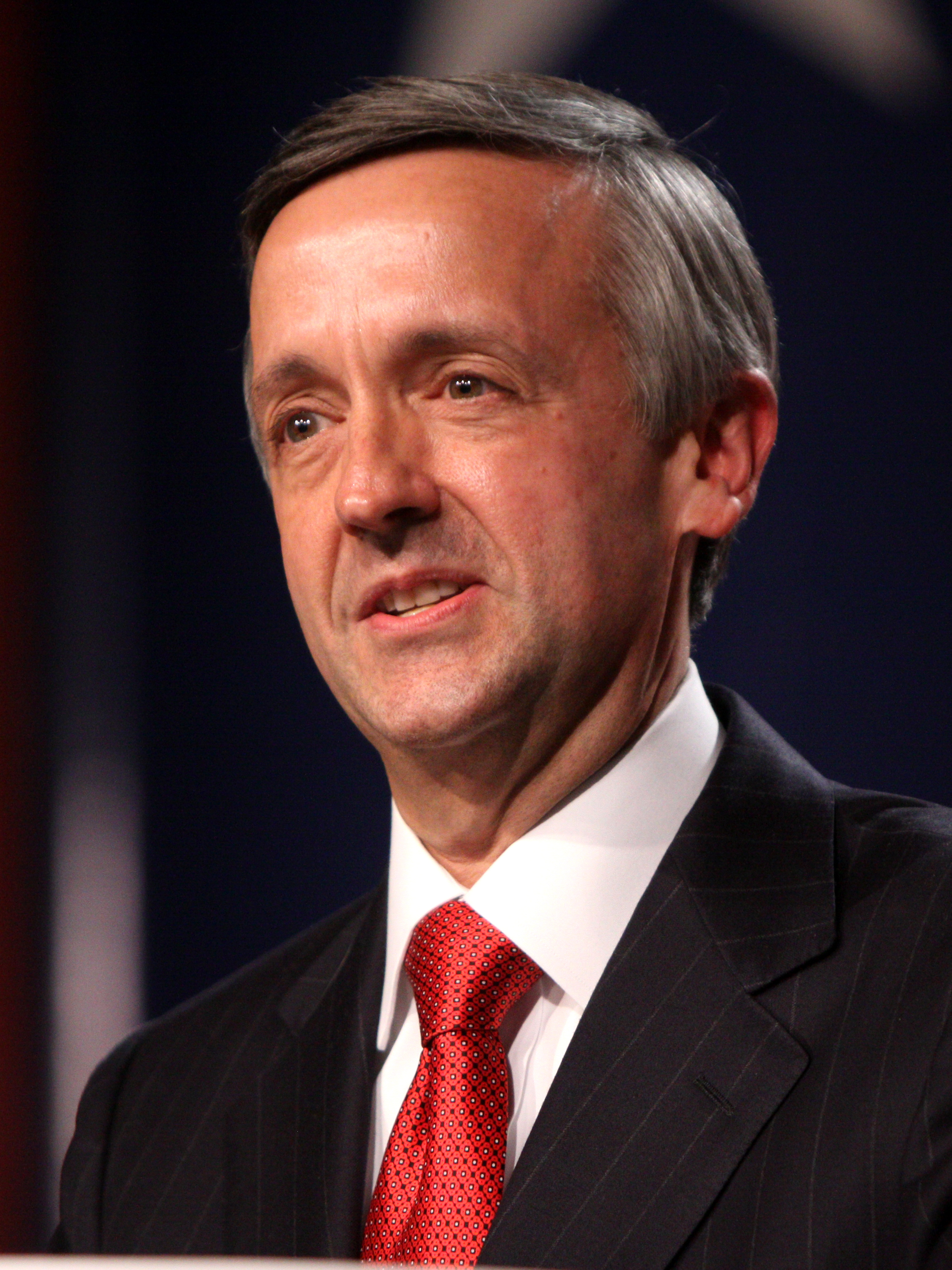
- Jeffress in 2011
- Born: Robert James Jeffress Jr. November 29, 1955 (age 70); Texas, U.S.
- Education: Baylor University (BS); Dallas Theological Seminary (ThM); Southwestern Baptist Theological Seminary (DMin)
- Occupation: Pastor of First Baptist Church
- Spouse: Amy Lyon Renard
- Children: 2
- Website: ptv.org

Robert James Jeffress Jr. (/ˈdʒɛfrəs/; born November 29, 1955) is an American Southern Baptist pastor, author, radio host, and televangelist. He is the senior pastor of the 16,000-member First Baptist Church, a megachurch in Dallas, Texas, and is a Fox News contributor. His sermons are broadcast on the television and radio program Pathway to Victory, which is broadcast on more than 1,200 television stations in the United States and 28 other countries and is heard on 900 stations and broadcast live in 195 countries.

Jeffress has frequently engaged in political activity, in sermons and on national news. He has endorsed Republican candidates for president, including Donald Trump, and has spoken at Republican conventions although he does not identify himself as a Republican. He has also been critical of Democratic politicians, which includes saying prior to the 2012 election that Barack Obama was "paving the way for the future reign of the Antichrist."

He opposes same-sex marriage and LGBT rights and said that gay individuals are involved in "filthy" and "degrading" practices and so are "much more prone to disease." He identifies with the evangelical wing of Christianity and has claimed that Roman Catholicism is influenced by Satan.

== Personal life and education ==
Robert Jeffress, Jr. was born to parents Robert Jeffress, Sr. (1925–1990) and Julia Caroline "Judy" Fielder (1931–1986). Jeffress and his wife, Amy Lyon Renard, have two daughters. Jeffress received a B.S. degree from Baylor University; a Master of Theology degree from Dallas Theological Seminary; and a Doctor of Ministry from Southwestern Baptist Theological Seminary in Fort Worth, Texas. In May 2010, he was awarded a Doctor of Divinity degree from Dallas Baptist University.

In 1986, Jeffress was a contestant on the syndicated nighttime edition of the popular game show Card Sharks, hosted by Bill Rafferty, winning $4,550 over four days. Jeffress grew up under pastor W. A. Criswell of First Baptist Dallas, citing him as an influence on his ministry. Like Criswell, Jeffress teaches dispensationalist theology.

On August 12, 2007, he was elected pastor of First Baptist Dallas, a megachurch of 16,000 members, succeeding Mac Brunson. Previously, Jeffress had been the senior pastor of First Baptist Church in Wichita Falls since 1992. He had been the senior pastor of First Baptist Church in Eastland, Texas, from 1985 to 1992. In 2006, Jeffress received the Daniel Award from Vision America. In 2011, the Southwestern Baptist Theological Seminary awarded Jeffress a distinguished alumni award for the impact of his ministry in Texas.

On January 20, 2017, Jeffress preached the sermon at a private service at St. John's Episcopal Church, attended by President-elect Donald Trump the day before his inauguration.

== First Baptist Church of Dallas ==
Jeffress oversaw the construction of the First Baptist Church's 3,000-seat pavilion. The $130 million church campus officially opened for Easter Sunday worship on March 31, 2013.

== Views ==
=== Social issues ===
After the August 2017 white supremacist rally in Charlottesville, Virginia, which left one woman dead, Jeffress condemned white supremacy: "Let there be no misunderstanding. Racism is sin. Period." In a separate interview, he stated that "all racism" is "repulsive and totally contradictory to the teaching of God."

In an interview with Christian Broadcasting Network, Jeffress commented on racial issues by saying, "There has been a failure on the part of the Church, even a failure on conservative Christians in decades past, to denounce racism, to embrace segregation, which is so wrong." He added, "I think we did have some catching up to do but I think that in this environment, we need to say clearly, that racism is abhorrent in the eyes of God."

A staunch opponent of same-sex marriage and LGBT rights, Jeffress claimed that gay marriage is "counterfeit" and has repeatedly targeted homosexuality in his sermons, saying that gay sexual practices are "filthy," "degrading ... beyond description," and "so much more prone to disease."

After the 2017 Las Vegas shooting, Jeffress appeared on the Fox Business network and said, "Evil is real, but evil is also temporary." After the church shooting in Charleston in June 2015, Jeffress was on Fox News and referred to the attack as "pure, unadulterated evil."

Jeffress supports COVID-19 vaccination and stated in 2021, “There is no credible religious argument against the vaccines.”

In January 2025, Jeffress denounced Episcopal Bishop Mariann Budde for asking President Trump to have "mercy" on undocumented immigrants and their families as well as LGBT adolescents, saying Budde had "insulted rather than encouraged the President."

=== Other religions ===
Jeffress believes that the teachings of Judaism, Islam, Mormonism, and Hinduism reject "the truth of Christ" and that their adherents "will go to hell if they do not accept Christ." In a sermon in August 2010, Jeffress said that Muhammad and Islam promoted pedophilia, referring to Aisha's age at marriage. Also in 2010, Jeffress referred to Roman Catholicism as a "Satanic" result of "Babylonian mystery religion." In another interview the same year, he said, "Mormonism is wrong, it is a heresy from the pit of Hell; Judaism, you can't be saved being a Jew, you know who said that by the way, the three greatest Jews in the New Testament, Peter, Paul, and Jesus Christ, they all said Judaism won't do it, it's faith in Jesus Christ." In October 2011, at the Values Voter Summit, Jeffress called the Church of Jesus Christ of Latter-day Saints (Mormonism) "a cult." He received widespread criticism for the statement but did not retract it despite Mitt Romney's request for him to do so.

In December 2010, Jeffress established a "Naughty and Nice List" in which businesses were identified based on whether or not they openly celebrated Christmas: "I wanted to do something positive to encourage businesses to acknowledge Christmas and not bow to the strident voices of a minority who object to the holiday." In June 2015, Jeffress compared the experience of conservative Christians in America to the experience of Jews in the Holocaust, for which he was sharply criticized by Rabbi Jack Moline, the then-executive director of the Interfaith Alliance. In December 2016, Jeffress said in an interview that he believes Christians are being "marginalized and attacked." On April 27, 2023, he was awarded the Friends of Zion award in Jerusalem at which he asserted the neighborly relations between Israel and Saudi Arabia would improve if Donald Trump was elected U.S. president in 2024.

== Political activity ==
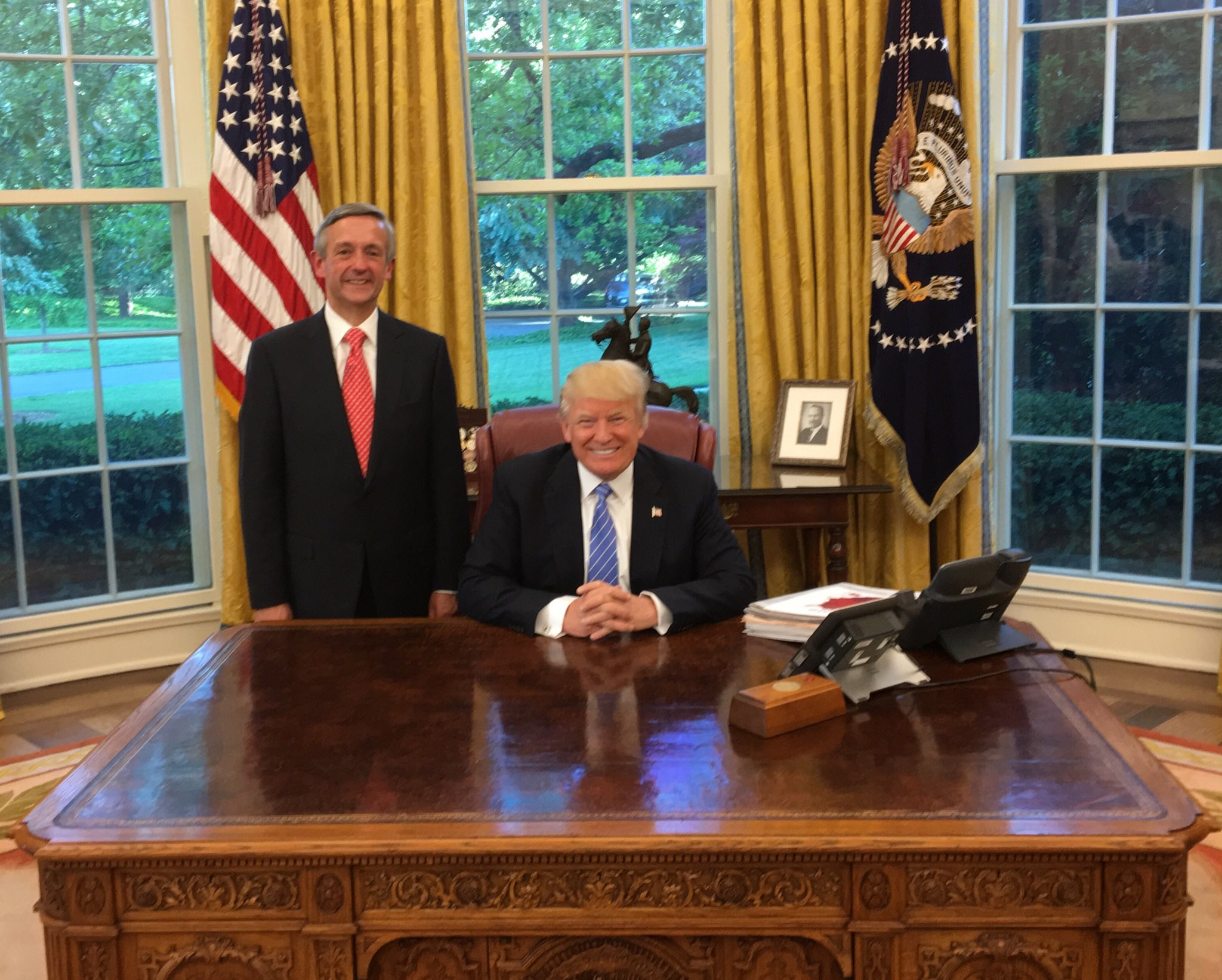
Jeffress with President Donald Trump in May 2017

His political activity is considerable, with political comments in sermons and frequent appearances on television news shows to defend Donald Trump and others and to defend or discuss political issues.

A staunch conservative, Jeffress supported Governor Rick Perry in the Republican presidential primaries for the 2012 presidential nomination. On October 7, 2011, he provoked a national controversy when he introduced Perry at the Values Voter Summit in Washington, DC, by suggesting that one of Perry's rivals, Mitt Romney of Massachusetts, is "opposed to Christianity." According to Jeffress, Romney's Mormonism contradicts the teachings of Jesus Christ. Jeffress had previously made a similar statement during the 2008 presidential primaries. Nevertheless, in April 2012, Jeffress endorsed Romney for president and strongly opposed the re-election of Barack Obama.

In September, Jeffress warned Romney that he was risking defeat by concentrating solely on economic issues in the campaign: "Up to this point, the Romney strategy has been to focus on the economy. Well this isn't working out well for him, is it? Because the economy is improving, and it fails to recognize that many of the Republican base, many of them are social conservatives who care about the economy, but we also care about the moral and spiritual deterioration of our country."

On November 4, 2012, the Sunday before the 2012 election, Jeffress said that Barack Obama was "paving the way for the future reign of the Antichrist."

For the 2016 US presidential election, Jeffress endorsed and appeared at rallies for the Republican candidate, Donald Trump although he initially endorsed Ben Carson. Jeffress also declared that Christians who would not vote for or support Trump as the Republican nominee were "fools" and "motivated by pride rather than principle." Jeffress also stated that if a candidate ran on the principles found in the Sermon on the Mount in dealing with foreign enemies of the United States such as ISIS, Iran, or North Korea, Jeffress "would run from that candidate as far as possible" and would still vote for Trump.

On June 21, 2016, then-candidate Donald Trump named Jeffress as a member of Trump's Evangelical Advisory Board and White House Faith Initiative. Jeffress described the Board's relationship with Trump: "This isn't so much our advising the president as it is the president seeking our perspective on a number of issues."

In March 2018, Jeffress appeared as a Fox News contributor to discuss allegations that Donald Trump had an affair with a former adult film star Stormy Daniels and said, "Even if it's proven to be true, it doesn't matter." He argued that those allegations are irrelevant since policies matter more than the president's personal life.

In September 2019, after the impeachment inquiry into Trump had been announced, Jeffress declared on Fox News: "I have never seen the Evangelical Christians more angry over any issue than this attempt to illegitimately remove this President from office... If the Democrats are successful in removing the President from office, it will cause a Civil War-like fracture in this nation from which our country will never heal." Trump later paraphrased Jeffress' quote in a tweet.

== Works ==
- Faith at the Crossroads: Responding to the Challenges of Life by Robert Jeffress, Baptist Sunday School Board, 1989 ISBN 978-0805450736
- Choose Your Attitudes, Change Your Life, Servant, 1992 ISBN 978-0896931237
- The Road Most Traveled: Releasing the Power of Contentment in Your Life, Broadman & Holman, 1996 ISBN 978-0805462661
- Say Goodbye To Regret by Robert Jeffress, Multnomah, 1998 ASIN B01F9GCVUQ
- As Time Runs Out: A Simple Guide to Bible Prophecy, Broadman & Holman, 1999 ISBN 978-0805420197
- When Forgiveness Doesn't Make Sense, WaterBrook, 2001 ISBN 978-1578564644
- Hearing the Master's Voice: The Comfort and Confidence of Knowing God's Will, WaterBrook, 2001 ISBN 978-1578562480
- The Solomon Secrets: 10 Keys to Extraordinary Success from Proverbs, WaterBrook, 2002 ISBN 157856249X
- I Want More!, WaterBrook, 2003 ISBN 978-1578565191
- Coming Home: To the Father Who Loves You, WaterBrook, 2005 ISBN 978-1578568574
- Grace Gone Wild!: Getting a Grip on God's Amazing Gift, WaterBrook, 2005 ISBN 978-1578565214
- The Divine Defense: Six Simple Strategies for Winning Your Greatest Battles, WaterBrook, 2006 ISBN 978-1400070909
- Second Chance, Second Act: Turning Your Messes into Successes, WaterBrook, 2007 ISBN 978-1400070916
- Outrageous Truth: Seven Absolutes You Can Still Believe, WaterBrook, 2008 ISBN 978-1400074945
- Twilight's Last Gleaming, Worthy Publishing, 2012 ISBN 978-1936034581
- Clutter-Free Christianity: What God Really Desires for You, WaterBrook, 2009 ISBN 978-1400070923
- Bible Studies for Life: Honest to God – Bible Study Book, LifeWay, 2013 ISBN 978-1430028956
- How Can I Know?: Answers to Life's 7 Most Important Questions, Worthy, 2013 ISBN 978-1936034598
- Pathway to Discovery, Pathway to Victory, 2014 ASIN B074WMPGTX
- Perfect Ending: Why Your Eternal Future Matters Today, Worthy Publishing, 2014 ISBN 978-1617951831
- Countdown to the Apocalypse: Why ISIS and Ebola Are Only the Beginning, FaithWords, 2015 ISBN 978-1455563043
- Not All Roads Lead to Heaven, Baker Books, 2016 ISBN 978-0801018756
- A Place Called Heaven: 10 Surprising Truths About Your Eternal Home, Baker Books, 2017 ISBN 978-0801018947
