= KTON (disambiguation) =

KTON is a radio station (1330 AM) licensed to serve Cameron, Texas, United States.

KTON or kton may also refer to:

- KTON (940 AM), a defunct radio station (940 AM) formerly licensed to serve Belton, Texas, United States
- kton, an abbreviation for kiloton
