= KRQX =

KRQX may refer to:

- KRQX-FM, a radio station (98.9 FM) licensed to Hurricane, Utah, United States
- KRMX (FM), a radio station (104.9 FM) licensed to Mexia, Texas, United States, which held the call sign KRQX-FM from 2007 to 2010
- KBHT (AM), a radio station (1590 AM) licensed to Mexia, Texas, which held the call sign KRQX from 1987 to 2010
