= KBHT =

KBHT may refer to:

- KBHT (AM), a radio station (1590 AM) licensed to serve Mexia, Texas, United States
- KRMX (FM), a radio station (104.9 FM) licensed to serve Bellmead, Texas, which held the call sign KBHT from 2013 to 2024
- KDVY, a radio station (93,5 FM) licensed to serve Crockett, Texas, which held the call sign KBHT from 1987 to 2013
