= KCBN =

KCBN may refer to:

- KCBN (FM), a radio station (102.5 FM) licensed to serve Whitesboro, Texas, United States
- KZBH, a radio station (107.7 FM) licensed to serve Hico, Texas, which used the call sign KCBN from 2014 to 2026
- KBZZ (AM), a radio station (1230 AM) licensed to serve Reno, Nevada, United States, which used the call sign KCBN from 1963 to 1989 and 1990 to 2001
