= KLRK =

KLRK may refer to:

- KLRK-FM, a radio station (88.7 FM) licensed to serve Yankton, South Dakota, United States
- KJLV (FM), a radio station (95.3 FM) licensed to serve Los Gatos, California, United States, which held the call sign KLRK from 2022 to 2023
- KRTY (FM), a radio station (91.9 FM) licensed to serve Great Bend, Kansas, United States, which held the call sign KLRK from 2020 to 2022
- KBHT (AM), a radio station (1590 AM) licensed to serve Media, Texas, United States, which held the call sign KLRK from 2010 to 2019
- KZBI (FM), a radio station (92.9 FM) licensed to serve Marlin, Texas, which held the call sign KLRK from 1999 to 2010
