= KTAE =

KTAE may refer to:

- KTAE (AM), a radio station (1260 AM) licensed to serve Elgin, Texas, United States
- KJFK (AM), a radio station (1490 AM) licensed to serve Austin, Texas, which held the call sign KTAE from 2014 to 2017
- KZBH, a radio station (107.7 FM) licensed to serve Hico, Texas, which held the call sign KTAE from 2012 to 2014
- KTON (AM), a radio station (1330 AM) licensed to serve Cameron, Texas, which held the call sign KTAE from 2007 to 2012
