= The Hangdogs =

American roots rock band

The Hangdogs was an American roots rock band from New York City, active from the mid-1990s through the early 2000s. The members were lead singer-songwriter Matthew Grimm, guitarist and pedal steel player Automatic Slim, bass guitarists J.C. Chmiel and Rob Gottstein, and drummers Kevin Baier and Dave Stengel. The line-up also included keyboardist/guitarist Kevin Karg in the early 2000s.

The Hangdogs garnered critical acclaim and received national press coverage, notably for their 1998 album East of Yesterday.

The members have remained active as musicians. The band held a one-off reunion show on November 14, 2021 at the Kessler Theater in Dallas, in memory of longtime KNON DJ and Hangdogs supporter Bruce Price ("BP"), who had died the previous November. Proceeds from the event benefited KNON, a non-commercial community radio station.

== Albums ==
- Same Old Story (1995)
- East of Yesterday (1998)
- Beware of Dog (2000)
- Something Left to Sell (2002)
- Wallace '48 (2003)
