= JWC =

JWC may refer to:

- John Witherspoon College, a non-denominational Christian liberal arts college in Rapid City, South Dakota
- Joint Warfare Centre, a NATO establishment headquartered in Stavanger, Norway
