= W. A. Criswell =

American pastor and author (1909–2002)

- Born: December 19, 1909; Eldorado, Jackson County, Oklahoma, U.S.
- Died: January 10, 2002 (aged 92); Dallas, Texas, U.S.
- Resting place: Sparkman-Hillcrest Cemetery
- Education: Baylor University; Southern Baptist Theological Seminary
- Occupations: Southern Baptist pastor; President of Southern Baptist Convention, 1968-1970; Founder, Criswell College; Editor Criswell Study Bible; Author of 54 books Pastor of First Baptist Church Dallas
- Years active: 1926–c. 2000
- Spouse(s): Bessie Marie Harris Criswell, "Betty" (d. 2006)
- Children: Mabel Ann Criswell (d. 2002)
- Parent(s): Wallie Amos and Anna Currie Criswell

Wallie Amos Criswell Jr. (December 19, 1909 – January 10, 2002), was an American Baptist pastor, author, and a two-term elected president of the Southern Baptist Convention from 1968 to 1970. As senior pastor of the First Baptist Church of Dallas for five decades, he became widely known for his biblical expositions as a great expositor and outstanding orator in Southern Baptist preaching at a popular level. He is regarded as a key figure in the late 1970s "Conservative Resurgence" within the Southern Baptist Convention.

== Early life ==
"Little Criswell" was born in Eldorado in Jackson County in southwestern Oklahoma to Wallie Amos (Sr.) and Anna Currie Criswell, the daughter of a notable Confederate Army surgeon Dr. D.B. Currie. It was not uncommon at the time for boys to be named with initials, and he was simply called "W. A.". In later years when a full name was required for his passport Criswell supplied his father's first and middle names. Criswell grew up in Texline in Dallam County, the most northwesterly community in the Texas Panhandle, where his cowboy-barber father moved the family in 1915.

At age ten, Criswell professed faith in Christ at a revival meeting led by the evangelist Reverend John Hicks. Two years later, Criswell publicly committed his life to the gospel ministry. Criswell was licensed to preach at the age of seventeen and soon thereafter held part-time pastorates at Devil's Bend and Pulltight, Texas.

While attending Baylor University in Waco, Texas, from 1928 to 1931, Criswell ministered in Marlow, White Mound, and Pecan Grove, Texas. During his graduate and post-graduate years, (while attaining his Ph.D. at the Southern Baptist Theological Seminary in Louisville, Kentucky) Criswell was the pastor of Baptist churches in Mount Washington in Bullitt County near Louisville and Oakland in Warren County near Bowling Green, Kentucky. After completing his degrees, Criswell in 1937 accepted the pastorate of the First Baptist Church of Chickasha in Grady County in central Oklahoma. In 1941, he moved to First Baptist Church of Muskogee in eastern Oklahoma. In 1935, Criswell married the former Bessie Marie "Betty" Harris (1913–2006), the pianist of the Mount Washington church and an education graduate of Western Kentucky University in Bowling Green. Their daughter Mabel Ann was born in Chickasha in 1939. Mabel Ann possessed an exceptional operatic voice and recorded three albums of sacred music in the late 1960s and early 1970s, two with the Ralph Carmichael orchestra. She died in 2002, some six months after her father's death.

== First Baptist Church of Dallas ==
For over fifty years Criswell was the pastor of the downtown First Baptist Church of Dallas, Texas, known for its Bible based teaching.

In 1944 Criswell was called to replace George Washington Truett as the pastor of the First Baptist Church in Dallas. He would spend the remainder of his pastoral ministry at First Baptist, preaching more than four thousand sermons from its pulpit. During his pastorship, the church grew exponentially with membership starting at 7,800 to 26,000, with weekly Sunday School attendance in excess of 5,000. The church expanded to multiple buildings covering five blocks in downtown Dallas, eventually becoming the largest Southern Baptist church in the world. The popular evangelist Billy Graham joined the church in 1953, became a close friend of the Criswell family, and remained a member of the Dallas congregation for 55 years.

Criswell was a driving force behind the pioneering movement in the modern megachurch phenomenon. He was also a visionary, who introduced a number of innovations at First Baptist Dallas that became a model for growing churches all over the country. By the early 1950s he had hired professionally trained educational directors for each age group of the church, organized a sophisticated multi-level Sunday School program, added a full-time business manager to the staff, and broadened the church into a youth and family life center featuring a bowling alley, skating rink, and gymnasium with a track and basketball court. He greatly expanded the church's long-standing Silent Friends ministry, creating for the deaf their own Sunday School, Training Union, Vacation Bible School, and summer camp ministries. His vigorous outreach efforts to the community included sponsoring thirty-seven inner city missions, a crisis pregnancy center, the Good Shepherd and Dallas Life Foundation ministries for the homeless and disadvantaged, Spanish-language chapels, and extensive television and radio ministries. Church services were locally televised as early as January 1951 and eventually were carried on stations nationwide.

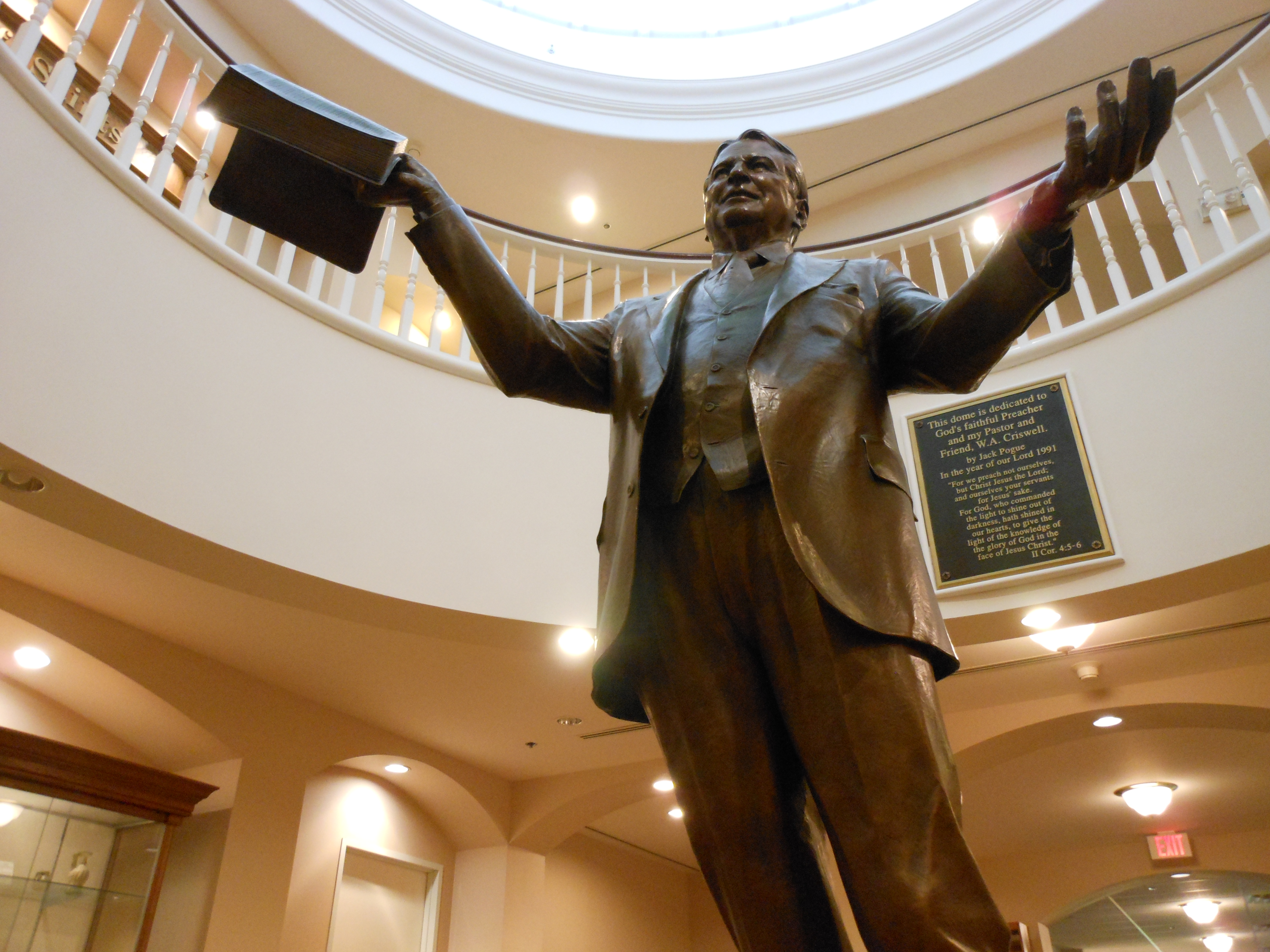
Statue of Criswell at Criswell College.

Criswell's accomplishments include helping to engineer the conservative resurgence of the Southern Baptist convention, a transition which began in the late 1970s. He was awarded eight honorary doctorates in addition to his earned postgraduate degree. He published fifty-four books, including an annotated Criswell Study Bible (in later editions the Believers Study Bible and Holy Bible, Baptist Study Edition, Thomas Nelson Publishers), and founded both Criswell College with its radio station KCBI, and First Baptist Academy.

At Criswell's request in 1988 a search committee was formed to identify and call a new pastor. On Thanksgiving Sunday evening 1990 First Baptist called Joel C. Gregory as pastor, following the unanimous recommendation of the pastor search committee and the deacons. Gregory became pastor while Criswell took the title "Senior Pastor." At the Wednesday evening service on September 30, 1992, Gregory announced his resignation, indicating that the intended succession of Criswell had not taken place. Gregory subsequently wrote Too Great a Temptation (Summit Group, 1994) describing his experiences during this period.

In 1993 First Baptist called O. S. Hawkins as pastor and Criswell entered semi-retirement as pastor emeritus. He continued to preach at conferences, First Baptist's annual pre-Easter series, Sunday school and college lectures, and occasional Sunday morning messages for the remainder of the decade.

== Death ==
Criswell died quietly at the home of longtime friend Jack Pogue on January 10, 2002, at the age of 92.

His death made national headlines, and as a farewell honor the city of Dallas closed off the U.S.-75 North Central Expressway for the celebrated pastor's funeral cortege.

== Influence ==
Well-known pastor and author Rick Warren recounts his call to full-time ministry as a 19-year-old student at California Baptist College, when in November 1973 he and a friend skipped classes and drove 350 miles to hear Criswell preach at the Jack Tar Hotel in San Francisco. Warren stood in line to shake hands with Criswell afterwards.

When my turn finally arrived, something unexpected happened. Criswell looked at me with kind, loving eyes and said, quite emphatically, "Young man, I feel led to lay hands on you and pray for you!" He placed his hands on my head and prayed: "Father, I ask that you give this young preacher a double portion of your Spirit. May the church he pastors grow to twice the size of the Dallas church. Bless him greatly, O Lord."

Warren went on to found the Saddleback Church in California, one of the most recognized ecumenical churches in the country, with weekly attendance in excess of 20,000. In his book, The Purpose Driven Church, Warren referred to Criswell as the "greatest American pastor of the twentieth century."

Audio recordings of Criswell's preaching began in December 1953, and over 4000 of his expository sermons are available free of charge in audio, video, and searchable transcript form at the W. A. Criswell Sermon Library website, one of the largest online collections by a single pastor in the world. It is sponsored and maintained by the non-profit W. A. Criswell Foundation which also supports Criswell College.

== Southern Baptist Convention Presidency ==
From 1969 to 1970 Dr. Criswell served as president of the Southern Baptist Convention, the largest non-Roman Catholic denomination in the United States, with some 16 million members. During the twenty years that followed he was perhaps the most popular preacher at evangelism and pastors' conferences in America, and also preached extensively in mission fields worldwide.

== Theology ==
Criswell's theology is best described as conservative and evangelical. He believed in Biblical inerrancy, the eternal security of the believer, and Jesus Christ as the authority of spiritual truth and the sole path to salvation of sinful mankind. Unlike his predecessor George W. Truett, Criswell preached dispensational premillennialism and the pretribulation rapture of the church.

== Politics ==
=== Integration ===
Criswell was initially critical of the U.S. Supreme Court decision in Brown v. Board of Education In 1956 he made an address denouncing forced integration to a South Carolina evangelism conference, and a day later to the South Carolina legislature. In it, he was particularly critical of the National Council of Churches and the National Association for the Advancement of Colored People, calling on his co-religionists to resist these "two-by scantling, good-for-nothing fellows who are trying to upset all of the things that we love as good old Southern people and as good old Southern Baptists" and referring to the intimidation of "those East Texans ... [such] that they dare not pronounce the word chigger any longer. It has to be cheegro." He labeled activists for forced racial integration “a bunch of infidels, dying from the neck up,” [and] preaching that “the idea of the universal brotherhood and the fatherhood of God is a denial of everything in the Bible.” Criswell also railed at federal intervention against de jure southern segregation.

Taken aback by negative reactions to his remarks in the press, Criswell did not publicly address the issue again for over a decade, claiming he was "a pastor, not a politician." However, upon his 1968 election as president of the Southern Baptist Convention and the SBC's endorsement of racial equality and desegregation, Criswell announced to the press, "Every Southern Baptist in the land should support the spirit of that statement. We Southern Baptists have definitely turned away from racism, from segregation, from anything and everything that speaks of a separation of people in the body of Christ." Criswell's first sermon after his election as SBC president in 1968 was titled "The Church of the Open Door," emphasizing that his church already had many non-white members and was open to all regardless of race. He asserted publicly, "I don't think that segregation could have been or was at any time intelligently, seriously supported by the Bible.

"Never in my life did I believe in separating people on the basis of skin pigmentation. Racism was, is, and always will be an abomination in the eyes of God, and should be in the eyes of God's people. And where we who call the name of Christ have knowingly or unknowingly contributed to racism in any form, we have sinned and need to beg God's forgiveness."

=== Presidential elections ===
In 1960 Criswell published an article attacking the appropriateness of Roman Catholics to serve as president, titled "Religious Freedom, the Church, the State, and Senator Kennedy." The address, the text of which is available from the Kennedy Library archives, stoked the concern of some Protestants at the prospect of a Catholic President, to which the Senator in question (John F. Kennedy) responded in a speech in which he cast himself as the candidate of the Democratic party rather than of the Catholic church, and committed himself to the separation of church and state. In 1976, Criswell supported the election of the Republican U.S. President Gerald R. Ford Jr., an Episcopalian, rather than the Southern Baptist Democratic nominee, former Georgia Governor Jimmy Carter.

=== Abortion ===
Questioned in 1973 about the Supreme Court's decision in Roe v. Wade Criswell replied, "I have always felt that it was only after a child was born and had a life separate from its mother that it became an individual person, and it has always, therefore, seemed to me that what is best for the mother and for the future should be allowed." Criswell later became a staunch opponent of the procedure.

== Selected works ==
- Acts, an Exposition. Zondervan 0-310-22880-8
- Acts: In One Volume. Zondervan 0-310-43840-3
- Baptism, Filling and Gifts of the Holy Spirit. Zondervan 0-310-22751-8
- Basic Bible Sermons on the Cross. Thomas Nelson 0-8407-1102-6
- The Christ of the Cross. Crescendo 0-89038-020-1
- The Compassionate Christ. Crescendo 0-89038-025-2
- Confessions of a Happy Christian. Pelican 0-88289-400-5
- Criswell's Guidebook For Pastors. Broadman & Holman 0-8054-2360-5
- The Criswell Study Bible. Thomas Nelson 0-84070-452-6
- Did Man Just Happen. Moody 0-8024-2212-8
- Expository Sermons on Revelations. Zondervan 0-310-22840-9
- Expository Sermons on the Book of Daniel. Zondervan 0-310-22800-X
- Great Doctrines of the Bible. Vol. 1: Bibliology. Zondervan 0-310-43930-2
- Great Doctrines of the Bible: Vol. 2: Christology. 0-310-43860-8
- Great Doctrines of the Bible: Vol. 3: Ecclesiology. Zondervan 0-310-43900-0
- Great Doctrines of the Bible: Vol. 4: Pneumatology. Zondervan
- Great Doctrines of the Bible: Vol, 5: Soteriology. Zondervan
- Great Doctrines of the Bible: Vol. 6: Christian Life and Stewardship. Zondervan 0-310-43950-7
- Great Doctrines of the Bible: vol. 7: Prayer/Angelology. Zondervan 0-310-43960-4
- Great Doctrines of the Bible: Vol. 8: Eschatology. Zondervan 0-310-43830-6
- Holy Bible: Baptist Study Edition. Thomas Nelson 0-7852-5838-8
- Isaiah: An Exposition. Zondervan 0-310-22870-0
- The Social Conscience of W. A. Criswell. Crescendo 0-89038-039-2
- Standing on the Promises: The Autobiography of W. A. Criswell. W Pub Group 0-8499-9038-6
- Welcome Back, Jesus!. Broadman 0-8054-1939-X
- Why I Preach That the Bible Is Literally True. Broadman & Holman 0-8054-1260-3
- With a Bible in My Hand. Broadman & Holman 0-8054-1520-3

== See also ==
- List of Southern Baptist Convention affiliated people
- Southern Baptist Convention
- Southern Baptist Convention Presidents

Preceded by H. Franklin Paschall	President of the Southern Baptist Convention; 1969–1970	Succeeded by Carl Bates
