= KSAO =

KSAO may refer to:

- KSAO (FM), a radio station (93.9 FM) licensed to serve San Angelo, Texas, United States
- KSAO-LD, a low-power television station (channel 14, virtual 49) licensed to serve Sacramento, California, United States
