= KRZI =

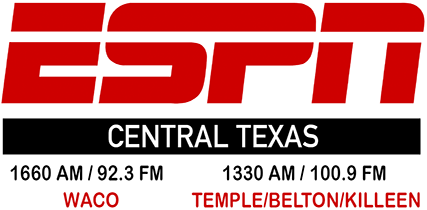
- Waco, Texas; United States
- Broadcast area: Waco, Texas
- Frequency: 1660 kHz
- Branding: ESPN Central Texas

Programming
- Format: Sports
- Affiliations: ESPN Radio, Westwood One

Ownership
- Owner: M&M Broadcasters; (M&M Broadcasters, Ltd.)
- Sister stations: KBHT; KRMX

History
- First air date: January 9, 1998 (as KAXY)
- Former call signs: KAXY (1998–1999); KRZX (1999–2004)

Technical information
- Licensing authority: FCC
- Facility ID: 87179
- Class: B
- Power: 10,000 watts (day); 1,000 watts (night)
- Transmitter coordinates: 31°24′46″N 97°12′38″W
- Translator: See § Translator

Links
- Public license information: Public file; LMS
- Webcast: Listen live
- Website: www.listencentraltexassports.com

KRZI (1660 AM, 92.3 FM ESPN Central Texas) is a radio station, paired with an FM relay translator, broadcasting a sports format. Both facilities are licensed to Waco, Texas, United States, and serve the Waco area. KRZI was fully simulcast on sister station 1330 KTON in Cameron, until that station was sold in 2023.

== Programming ==
KRZI features programming from ESPN Radio and Westwood One. While the station airs local programming, roughly 75 percent is ESPN content. The associated stations have the broadcast rights for the NFL, the Texas Rangers, The Baylor Bears and NCAA Basketball and Football. Simmons, based in Salt Lake City, Utah, also owns and operates Simmons Radio in Utah, Western Broadcasting, Simmons Lone Star Media, Simmons Outdoor Media, Simmons Ventures and Morris Murdock Travel.

== History ==
KRZI originated as the expanded band "twin" of an existing station on the standard AM band.

On March 17, 1997, the Federal Communications Commission (FCC) announced that eighty-eight stations had been given permission to move to newly available "Expanded Band" transmitting frequencies, ranging from 1610 to 1700 kHz, with the original KRZI authorized to move from 1580 kHz to 1660 kHz.

A construction permit for the expanded band station was assigned the call letters KAXY on January 9, 1998. The FCC's initial policy was that both the original station and its expanded band counterpart could operate simultaneously for up to five years, after which owners would have to turn in one of the two licenses, depending on whether they preferred the new assignment or elected to remain on the original frequency, although this deadline was extended multiple times. It was ultimately decided to transfer full operations to the expanded band station, and on May 18, 2006, the license for the original station on 1580 AM, now with the call sign KQRL, was cancelled. This allowed KEKR (1590 AM) in Mexia to move farther west in Limestone County, to cover Waco proper with its daytime signal.

AM 1660 changed its call sign to KRZX on August 30, 1999, and to KRZI on October 7, 2004.

In the summer of 2004 KRZI and its sister stations became owned by Simmons Media Group (now Redrock Broadcasting), which in 2009 sold its entire Waco station cluster to M&M Broadcasters.

== Translator ==
Broadcast translator for KRZI
Call sign	Frequency	City of license	FID	ERP (W)	HAAT	Class	Transmitter coordinates	FCC info	Notes
K222DC	92.3 FM	Waco, Texas	202389	250	108 m (354 ft)	D	31°32′15″N 97°5′32″W	LMS	First air date: September 12, 2018
