= Homer G. Lindsay Jr. =

American Southern Baptist preacher

Homer Gentry Lindsay Jr. (July 10, 1927 – February 13, 2000) was an American Southern Baptist preacher. He co-pastored the nation's third-largest Southern Baptist church, the First Baptist Church of Jacksonville, Florida, with Jerry Vines. Both pastors are notable for their conservative and sometimes controversial public stances, and their wide-reaching influence in the local political arena. According to Paige Patterson, Lindsay was "one of the great soul-winners of all Christian history".

== History ==
Lindsay was born in Nashville, Tennessee, and moved to Jacksonville with his family as a child. His father, Homer G. Lindsay Sr., began pastoring the First Baptist Church of Jacksonville in 1940. At the age of 16, Homer Junior decided to also become a preacher, and later graduated from Stetson University in DeLand, Florida, going on to study ministry at Southwestern Baptist Theological Seminary in Fort Worth, Texas. In September 1952 he married Shirley Tillman of Lake Wales, Florida and began pastoring a 42-member church in Miami, Florida. By the late 1960s, the church had grown to 3,200 members.

In January 1969, Lindsay returned to Jacksonville to co-pastor the 2,600-member First Baptist Church with his father, who later retired in 1973 and died in 1981. By the time of Lindsay's retirement in 1999, the church had a Sunday morning attendance of about 7,000, eighteen ordained ministers, an annual budget of over $9 million, full-time staff of 142, and land and other assets valued at about $6 million.
