= First Baptist Church of Jacksonville =

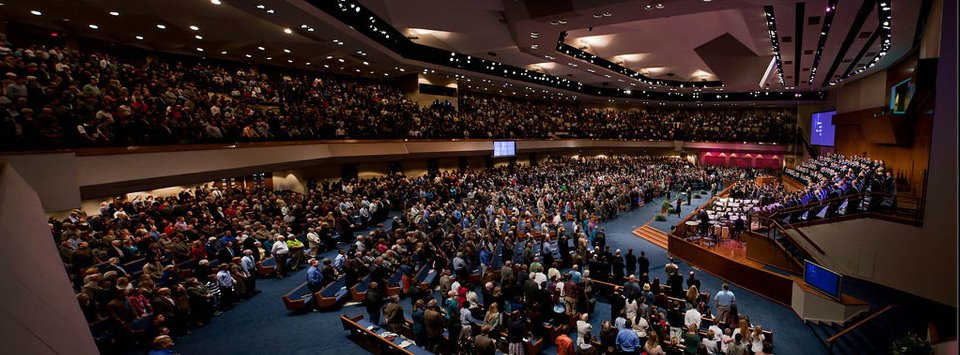
- Worship service in 2011

- 30.3323°N 81.6584°W
- Location: Jacksonville, Florida
- Country: United States
- Denomination: Baptist
- Website: fbcjax.com

History
- Founded: 1838

Administration
- Division: Florida Baptist Convention

Clergy
- Pastor: Heath Lambert

The First Baptist Church of Jacksonville is a Baptist megachurch in Downtown Jacksonville, Florida, U.S.. It is affiliated with the Southern Baptist Convention. As of 2023, First Baptist Church has 2,100 members and an average attendance of around 3,000 for Sunday services. The main Downtown Campus comprises several square blocks of property connected by above-ground crosswalks. The campus includes several auditoriums for services, a Sunday school building, and facilities for First Baptist Academy, a private K-12 school.

First Baptist Church has its origins in the oldest Baptist congregation in Jacksonville, Bethel Baptist Church, established in 1838. The church experienced a period of considerable growth in the mid-20th century, eventually encompassing eleven square blocks of downtown Jacksonville. Several former pastors, including Homer G. Lindsay Jr. and Jerry Vines, were widely influential in the Southern Baptist Convention, leading it in both growth and a shift towards conservatism.

== History ==
=== Early years ===
First Baptist Church traces its origins to Bethel Baptist Church (now Bethel Baptist Institutional Church), the earliest Baptist church to be founded in Jacksonville. Bethel Baptist was established under co-pastors James McDonald and Ryan Frier in July 1838 with only six charter members, four whites and two blacks, the latter of whom were slaves of white members. Membership quickly grew, with most early congregants being black slaves who received day passes from their masters to attend. The first meetings were held at "Mother Sam's", a local plantation, and in 1861 a permanent meeting hall was erected in Downtown Jacksonville at Church and Julia Streets. The Bethel Baptist Church remained interracial until after the American Civil War, at which point the decision was made to segregate the congregation by race. White members attempted to force out the blacks, and took their case to court. However, the court found in favor of the blacks, who were in the majority, determining that they were the rightful owners of the Bethel Baptist name and property. As a result the whites left the congregation, forming Tabernacle Baptist Church, which was eventually renamed First Baptist Church.

In 1866, Tabernacle Baptist Church purchased the Church Street property from Bethel Baptist Church, as was required by the court. The church went through a number of changes over the next years, and in 1892 it moved to its current location between Church and Hogan Streets, adopting the name First Baptist Church. W.A. Hobson became pastor in May 1900 who served for 23 years. The building was entirely destroyed in the Great Fire of 1901, which ravaged downtown Jacksonville. In 1903, the foundation was laid for a new building, which was completed within a year. This building, now known as Hobson Auditorium, still serves as part of the larger First Baptist complex. Len G. Broughton served as the next pastor of the church from 1923 to 1927.

=== 20th century to present ===
The church did not fare well in the early 20th century. By 1940, First Baptist had accumulated a debt of $125,000 and saw its educational building repossessed by its creditors. That year, the church hired Homer Lindsay Sr. as their senior pastor. Under his leadership the church reversed its fortunes, and within a few years it paid off its debt, acquired a new education building, and grew its congregation. In 1969 First Baptist hired Lindsay's son, Homer G. Lindsay Jr., as co-pastor; he took over sole pastoral duties upon his father's retirement in 1975. Under Lindsay Jr. the church experienced even faster growth, emerging as a megachurch with thousands of members and many new buildings, including a new 3,500-seat auditorium.

Jerry Vines joined Lindsay as co-pastor in 1982. First Baptist grew even further, becoming a major power in the Southern Baptist Convention and adding a 10,000-seat auditorium in 1993. Vines became a key leader in the growing Convention and was a major figure in its shift toward strict conservatism. Vines and First Baptist Church received national attention in June 2002 for Vines' controversial statements regarding Islam. Lindsay died in 2000 and Vines retired in 2006; Mac Brunson was hired as senior pastor that year. Recent developments include the establishment of First Baptist Academy and of a satellite campus of the church in neighboring St. Johns County. Heath Lambert is the current senior pastor.

In 2012, Bethel Baptist Church and First Baptist had a joint service, celebrating their 160th anniversary. A second campus was established in Nocatee, Florida. First Baptist Church's attendance and influence has been declining for the past 20 years.

== See also ==
- List of the largest churches in the U.S.
