= Jerry Vines =

American preacher

Charles Jerry Vines (born September 1937) is an American preacher and former pastor of what was then the nation's third largest Southern Baptist church, the First Baptist Church of Jacksonville, Florida. Like his former co-pastor Homer G. Lindsay Jr., Vines is well known for his conservative and sometimes controversial public stances, as well as his wide-reaching influence in the Southern Baptist Convention and the local political arena. He retired from the First Baptist pulpit on February 7, 2006, and was succeeded by Mac Brunson. On February 4, 2007, Brunson named Vines Pastor Emeritus of the church.

== Biography ==
Jerry Vines was born in Carrollton, Georgia near Atlanta in 1937. Before attending seminary, he pastored his first church, Centralhatchee Baptist Church, at the age of 16. He was educated at Mercer University, New Orleans Baptist Theological Seminary, and Luther Rice University before pastoring in churches in Alabama and Georgia. While pastor of Dauphin Way Baptist Church in Mobile, Alabama he was elected President of the Alabama Pastors' Conference. He relocated to Jacksonville in 1982 to co-pastor the First Baptist Church with Homer G. Lindsay Jr.

In June 1988, he was elected president of the Southern Baptist Convention, served two terms, and was supportive of the Southern Baptist Convention conservative resurgence. During his first 20 years at First Baptist Jacksonville, he baptized 18,177 people and oversaw the building of an $8 million preschool building, a $16 million auditorium and four parking garages, totaling almost $14 million. Vines also was influential in starting the First Baptist Church Pastors' Conference which drew thousands of ministers and church works from across the world. Vines announced his retirement from First Baptist in May 2005 and preached his last sermon as pastor of the church in 2006 at the close of the 20th annual Pastors' conference. In 2017, Vines enrolled in the Ph.D program at the Southwestern Baptist Theological Seminary in Fort Worth, TX.

He has since started his own ministry, Jerry Vines Ministries. This ministry is an outreach to further educate pastors in different areas of the ministry. Vines is married to the former Janet Denney and they have four children and seven grand children.

== Controversy ==
Vines sparked controversy in June 2002 for remarks he made at a Southern Baptist Convention conference that were critical of Islam and Muhammad. Referencing Ergun and Emir Caner's book Unveiling Islam, Vines said that "Allah is not Jehovah… Jehovah's not going to turn you into a terrorist that'll try to bomb people and take the lives of thousands and thousands of people," and that "Christianity was founded by the virgin-born Jesus Christ" while "Islam was founded by Muhammad, a demon-possessed pedophile who had 12 wives, and his last one was a 9-year-old girl." This reference was to Aisha, who is said to have been married to Muhammad when she was six years old and about nine when her marriage to Muhammad was consummated, according to several hadith or Islamic accounts of the life of Muhammad. The comments stirred a brief national debate on "Islamophobia" and the demonization of Islam in relation to the war on terrorism. Vines initially defended his comments and invited "Muslim scholars to explain their own documents to us all." He also refused to apologize for the statements or to meet with local Muslim leaders. He was heavily criticized, but was defended by fellow Baptist preacher Jerry Falwell, who wrote a letter supporting him. Falwell was asked about the letter during a 60 Minutes interview in October, and sparked an even greater outrage by declaring that he considered Muhammad a terrorist. He later apologized for his comments. When the story was covered by NBC Nightly News with Tom Brokaw on February 25, 2003, Vines finally broke his silence on the issue, claiming that his statements had been overemphasized in media reports, and that he had not intended to evoke hate.

Jerry Vines was found to have covered up allegations of abuse by Darrell Gilyard towards young women with Paige Patterson from 1991. One of several young women, abused by Gilyard, said she reported her abuse to Vines, who was reported to have responded by asking her to stay silent as "it may be embarrassing for her [the abused]". He allegedly spoke to Paige Patterson and no police action was undertaken into the claims.

== Selected works ==
- "I Shall Return"... Jesus: A Biblical Perspective Of End Times (Victor Books, 1977)
- Interviews With Jesus (Broadman Press, 1981)
- A Practical Guide To Sermon Preparation (Moody Publishers, 1985)
- Spirit Life: Experience The Power, Excitement, and Intimacy of God's Shaping Hand (Broadman & Holman Publishers, 1998)
- Power In The Pulpit: How To Prepare and Deliver Expository Sermons (Moody Publishers, 1999)
- Pursuing God's Own Heart: Lessons From The Life Of David (Broadman & Holman Publishers, 2003)

== See also ==
- List of Southern Baptist Convention affiliated people
- Southern Baptist Convention
- Southern Baptist Convention Presidents
- Criticism of Muhammad

| Preceded by Adrian Rogers | President of the Southern Baptist Convention; 1989–1990 | Succeeded by Morris Chapman |
