= Bethel Church (Jacksonville, Florida) =

Historic church in Florida, United States

The Bethel Church
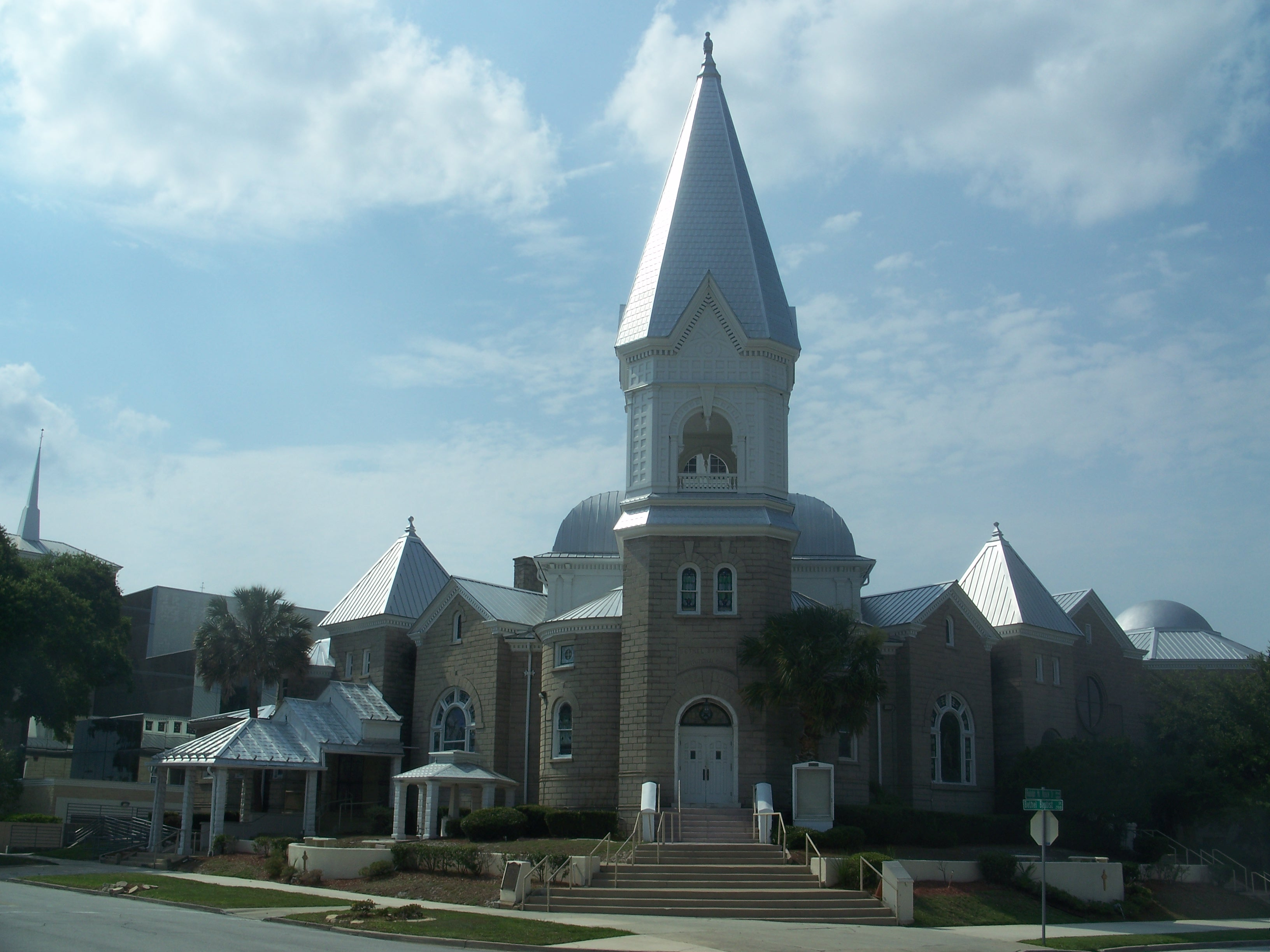
- Historic building on complex
- The Bethel Church
- 30°20′9″N 81°39′30″W
- Location: Jacksonville, Florida
- Country: USA
- Denomination: Baptist
- Website: thebethelexperience.com

History
- Founded: 1838
- Founder(s): James McDonald and Ryan Frier

The Bethel Church (formerly Bethel Baptist Institutional Church) is a historically-black Baptist megachurch in Jacksonville, Florida, in the United States. Founded in 1838, it is the city's oldest Baptist congregation. The attendance is 12,000 members. The senior pastor is Bishop Rudolph W. McKissick Jr. The historic church building is on the National Register of Historic Places.

== History ==
Established under co-pastors James McDonald and Ryan Frier, in 1838, Bethel Baptist is the oldest Baptist congregation in Jacksonville. At its inception it had only six charter members, four whites and two blacks, the latter of whom were held as slaves by white members. The first meetings were held at "Mother Sam's", a local plantation. Membership quickly grew, with most early congregants being enslaved African Americans who received day passes from their masters to attend services.

In 1840 a dedicated meeting house was erected at Duval and Newnan streets. The first church building in Jacksonville was sold to Presbyterians in 1844.

In 1861 the congregation built a permanent church structure in the west LaVilla neighborhood at Church and Julia streets. Bethel Baptist was interracial until after the American Civil War and emancipation. Whites decided to segregate the congregation by race. At this time members were already facing a split over which pastor to follow, and white congregants tried to force the blacks, now freedmen, out of the church. They took their case to court, but the court ruled in favor of the freedmen, who were the majority of the congregation, and ruled that they were the rightful owners of the Bethel Baptist name and property. In this period across the South, many black Baptists were withdrawing from white-dominated churches to set up their own outside white control. They soon also established regional association and eventually a national organization.

As a result, the whites formed Tabernacle Baptist Church, which they eventually renamed as First Baptist Church, which used to be one of the largest Baptist churches in the United States, but has drastically declined in attendance over the last decade.

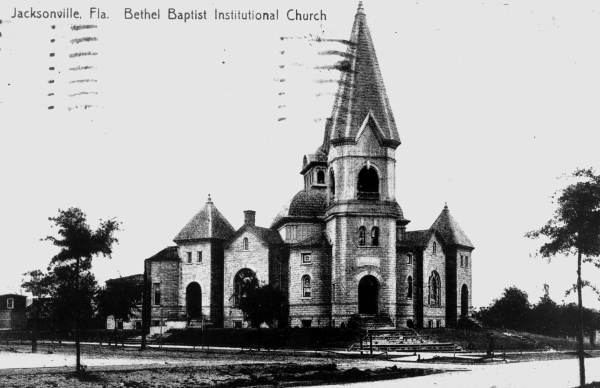
The Bethel Baptist Institutional Church building around 1911.

Tabernacle Baptist purchased the Church Street property from Bethel Baptist Church, as was required by the court. Cataline Simmons served as the black church's first pastor. In 1868 Bethel Baptist relocated to a large new building on Union and Pine streets. In 1895 they replaced this structure with a large brick building. This burned in the Great Fire of 1901, which destroyed much of downtown Jacksonville.

In 1904 the current edifice was built by architect M. H. Hubbard from Utica, New York. The 1904 building combined elements of Greek Revival and Romanesque Revival architecture. This building, located at 1058 North Hogan Street, was added to the National Register of Historic Places in 1978.

Through this time Bethel Baptist continued to grow considerably, but political infighting led to parts of the congregation splintering off and founding new churches. By 1890 there were 1,200 members and the church received more than $3,000 in pledges every year. In 1894 it was recognized as an Institutional Church by the state of Florida, authorizing it to undertake social and educational work.

The late 20th century congregation opened a new larger church complex in 1988, next to the 1904 church. The three-story addition serves as an educational and administrative building. In 2000, the campus was further expanded with a $7.5 million building that contains a new sanctuary, conference center, space for youth and other support groups, and bookstore.

In 2023, the church's average attendance was 14,000 people.
