= Jerry A. Johnson =

American theologian

Jerry A. Johnson is the former President of the National Religious Broadcasters. He became president of NRB on November 1, 2013, succeeding Frank Wright. Before accepting that post, he was President of Criswell College, and former dean of academics at Midwestern Baptist Theological Seminary. He also held several positions during 14 years at Southern Baptist Theological Seminary. From 2013 to 2014 he served as Chairman of the Nominating Committee of the Southern Baptist Convention.

In 2026, he announced he had converted to Roman Catholicism.
