= Cataline Simmons =

Religious and political leader in Florida

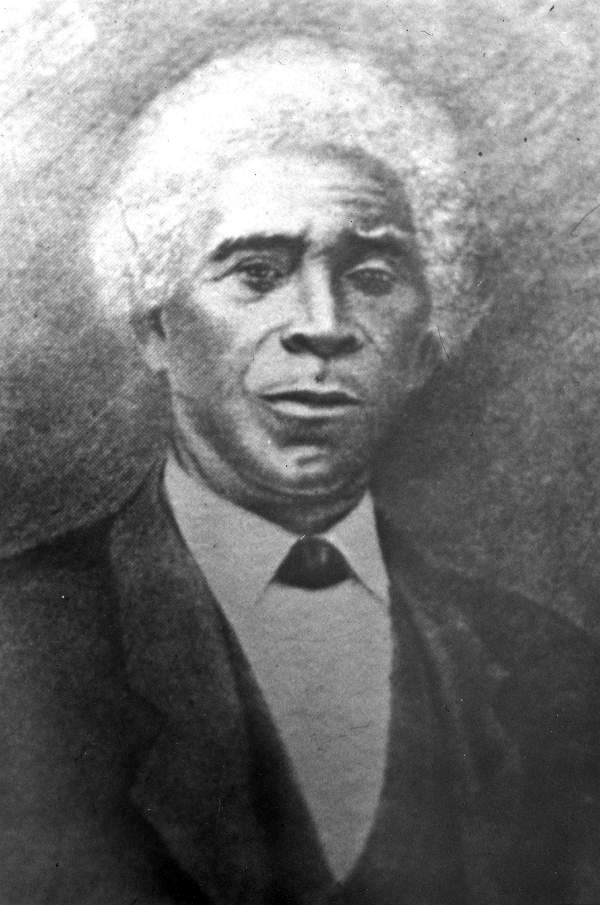
- Simmons c. 1870

Member of the Jacksonville City Council
- In office 1870–1872

Personal details
- Born: Cataline B. Simmons; 1806 Beaufort, South Carolina, U.S.
- Died: July 13, 1883 (aged 76–77)
- Occupation: Politician, businessman, pastor

Cataline B. Simmons (1806 – July 13, 1883) was an American businessman, politician, and religious leader in Florida.

Simmons was born in Beaufort, South Carolina in 1806. He was brought to Florida while he was enslaved and reportedly was able to ultimately purchase his freedom.

Simmons served as the first pastor of the Bethel Baptist Institutional Church in Jacksonville, Florida. He served as its pastor from 1868 to 1880.

Simmons served as a Duval County commissioner from 1868 to 1870. He and William T. Garvin then became the first African Americans to serve on the Jacksonville City Council, serving on it from 1870 to 1872. He also served as a tax assessor. At the time of his death, Simmons was noted as one of the wealthiest "colored men" in Jacksonville.
