= Eldorado, Oklahoma =

- Town
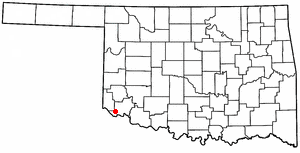
- Location of Eldorado, Oklahoma
- Coordinates: 34°28′23″N 99°38′59″W
- Country: United States
- State: Oklahoma
- County: Jackson

Area
  - Total: 0.73 sq mi (1.90 km^{2})
  - Land: 0.73 sq mi (1.90 km^{2})
  - Water: 0 sq mi (0.00 km^{2})
- Elevation: 1,450 ft (440 m)

Population (2020)
  - Total: 317
  - Density: 432.1/sq mi (166.82/km^{2})
- Time zone: UTC-6 (Central (CST))
  - Summer (DST): UTC-5 (CDT)
- ZIP code: 73537
- Area code: 580
- FIPS code: 40-23350
- GNIS feature ID: 2412471

Eldorado is a town in Jackson County, Oklahoma, United States. As of the 2020 census, Eldorado had a population of 317.

The Southern Baptist pastor, W. A. Criswell, was born in Eldorado in 1909. He was the long-term pastor of the First Baptist Church of Dallas, Texas.

== Geography ==
According to the United States Census Bureau, the town has a total area of 0.8 square miles (2.1 km^{2}), all land.

== Demographics ==
Historical population
Census	Pop.	Note	%±
1910	926		—
1920	967		4.4%
1930	1,183		22.3%
1940	929		−21.5%
1950	732		−21.2%
1960	708		−3.3%
1970	737		4.1%
1980	688		−6.6%
1990	573		−16.7%
2000	527		−8.0%
2010	446		−15.4%
2020	317		−28.9%
U.S. Decennial Census

=== 2020 census ===
As of the 2020 census, Eldorado had a population of 317. The median age was 38.2 years. 27.8% of residents were under the age of 18 and 22.7% of residents were 65 years of age or older. For every 100 females there were 98.1 males, and for every 100 females age 18 and over there were 99.1 males age 18 and over.

0.0% of residents lived in urban areas, while 100.0% lived in rural areas.

There were 136 households in Eldorado, of which 37.5% had children under the age of 18 living in them. Of all households, 41.9% were married-couple households, 29.4% were households with a male householder and no spouse or partner present, and 23.5% were households with a female householder and no spouse or partner present. About 30.1% of all households were made up of individuals and 20.6% had someone living alone who was 65 years of age or older.

There were 231 housing units, of which 41.1% were vacant. The homeowner vacancy rate was 4.3% and the rental vacancy rate was 13.9%.

Racial composition as of the 2020 census
Race	Number	Percent
White	215	67.8%
Black or African American	6	1.9%
American Indian and Alaska Native	15	4.7%
Asian	0	0.0%
Native Hawaiian and Other Pacific Islander	1	0.3%
Some other race	55	17.4%
Two or more races	25	7.9%
Hispanic or Latino (of any race)	86	27.1%

=== 2010 census ===
As of the census of 2010, there were 446 people living in the town. The population density was 560 inhabitants per square mile (220/km^{2}). There were 274 housing units at an average density of 389.9 per square mile (150.5/km^{2}). The racial makeup of the town was 90.70% White, 1.14% Native American, 0.19% Asian, 6.83% from other races, and 1.14% from two or more races. Hispanic or Latino of any race were 8.35% of the population.

There were 234 households, out of which 25.6% had children under the age of 18 living with them, 47.4% were married couples living together, 10.7% had a female householder with no husband present, and 38.0% were non-families. 35.9% of all households were made up of individuals, and 23.9% had someone living alone who was 65 years of age or older. The average household size was 2.25 and the average family size was 2.90.

In the town, the population was spread out, with 23.7% under the age of 18, 9.3% from 18 to 24, 19.4% from 25 to 44, 18.8% from 45 to 64, and 28.8% who were 65 years of age or older. The median age was 43 years. For every 100 females, there were 84.3 males. For every 100 females age 18 and over, there were 87.9 males.

The median income for a household in the town was $21,806, and the median income for a family was $26,354. Males had a median income of $25,000 versus $15,000 for females. The per capita income for the town was $12,003. About 20.3% of families and 23.8% of the population were below the poverty line, including 24.8% of those under age 18 and 25.0% of those age 65 or over.
