= C. Richard Wells =

American evangelical pastor, theologian and college president

C. Richard Wells is an American evangelical pastor, theologian, and college president.

Wells was a member of the founding faculty of Beeson Divinity School, where he taught Ancient Greek, former President of Criswell College (1996-2003), Pastor of South Canyon Baptist Church in Rapid City, South Dakota, from 2004–2009, and Dean of Chapel at Union University in Jackson, Tennessee from 2009 through 2011.

In 2011 Wells returned to Rapid City, South Dakota to restructure the Black Hills Bible Institute into John Witherspoon College and Institute for Christian Leadership, where he was President, until replaced by Ronald Lewis in 2019.

== Bibliography ==
- Forgotten Songs, co-edited with Ray Van Neste, (B&H Publishing Group, 2012, ISBN 143367839X)
- Inspired Preaching; Inspired Preaching: A Survey of Preaching Found in the New Testament, co-edited with A. Boyd Luter (B&H Publishing Group, 2002, ISBN 978-0-8054-2417-1)
- Perception and Faith: The Integration of Gestalt Psychology and Christian Theology in the Thought of C. S. Lewis, PhD dissertation, Baylor University, 1985
