= Central Texas Christian School =

Location
- 4141 West FM 93; Temple, Texas 76502; United States; 31.040598°N 97.412°W

Information
- Type: Private school Christian
- Motto: Teaching Truth That Transforms
- Religious affiliation: Christian
- Established: 1987
- Head of School: Dr. Jared Roan
- Grades: PreK-12
- Enrollment: 550 (2026-2027)
- Colors: Black and red
- Mascot: Lion
- Website: ctcslions.com

Central Texas Christian School (CTCS) is a private pre-K-12 Christian school in Temple, Texas, United States. Its goal is to graduate students who are academically and spiritually ready for leadership. CTCS is associated with the Association of Christian Schools International (ACSI).

== History ==
In 2014, Brian Littlefield, previously head of First Baptist Academy of Dallas, became the head of Central Texas Christian.

== Athletics ==
- Baseball
- Softball
- Basketball
- Cheerleading
- Football
- Track and field
- Volleyball
- Cross country
- Golf
- Swimming
