= KCBI (AM) =

Currently silent
- Garland, Texas; United States
- Broadcast area: Dallas/Fort Worth Metroplex
- Frequency: 770 kHz

Programming
- Language: English
- Format: Christian talk; brokered; (To become Christian Teaching by Fall 2026)

Ownership
- Owner: First Dallas Media, Inc.
- Sister stations: KCBI-FM; KCBN; KZBI

History
- First air date: 1990 (as KPBC)
- Former call signs: KPBC (1990–1999) KAAM (1999–2025)
- Call sign meaning: Criswell Bible Institute, former owner of KCBI-FM

Technical information
- Licensing authority: FCC
- Facility ID: 17303
- Class: B
- Power: 10,000 watts (day); 1,000 watts (Night)
- Transmitter coordinates: 33°1′58″N 96°34′31″W

Links
- Public license information: Public file; LMS
- Webcast: unknown
- Website: unknown

KCBI is an AM radio station broadcasting in the Dallas/Fort Worth "Metroplex" with a format of Christian talk and brokered programming. This station is licensed in Garland, Texas, United States, and is owned and operated by First Dallas Media. KCBI is a Class B station operating on the clear-channel frequency of 770 AM.

== History ==
KPBC (the call letters stood for Percy B. Crawford, founder of Crawford Broadcasting) originally broadcast on 1040 kHz as a daytime-only station and changed frequencies to 770 kHz when Crawford completed the construction to create KPBC 770 in 1990 as a 24/7 station. The call letters were changed to KAAM on October 19, 1999.

The KAAM (also known on the air as K-Double-AM) format began when the city of Dallas sold WRR, its AM station on 1310 kHz, to Bonneville Broadcasting in January 1978. Because the city was going to retain the WRR call letters for its classical music FM station, Bonneville changed the 1310 call letters of the AM station to KAAM and added an FM station on 92.5 with the callsign KAFM. KAAM lasted on 1310 for many years, finally selling the station to Susquehanna Radio Corporation on February 8, 1994, which changed the call letters to KTCK (The "Ticket") and the format to all-sports.

In 1999, KAAM (formerly on AM 620 kHz) and its nostalgic/oldies format were once again revived on 770 kHz in Garland, Texas, by another owner/enthusiast. This time, the station is branded as Legends 77. Since launch, it competed with 1190 KLUV (1190 AM) and KLUV-FM 98.7 during their times as oldies stations. The FM however, transitioned to classic hits in 2005. This station was since then divested by Crawford in mid-2007 and sold to his son, Don Crawford, Jr.

On March 1, 2010, KAAM added a talk block to its weekday lineup. From 1pm to 4pm daily, a rotation of medical and financial programs dubbed "Ask the Pros" took the place of regular music programming.

KAAM formerly broadcast using HD Radio until 2010. Because the license to broadcast digital "HD Radio" is perpetual, the station could resume digital broadcasts at any time.

According to an editorial message broadcast by Don Crawford, Jr., the 2013 rating statistics indicate that KAAM was the most listened to AM radio station airing the nostalgic format in the United States online via the internet. KAAM is streamed online via the popular TuneIn app

Hermann Bockelmann's weekly program "Europe Today" was being re-aired weekly as "The Best of Bockelmann".

On Friday, May 19, 2017, owner Don Crawford, Jr. posted an announcement on the station's Facebook page that KAAM would drop the nostalgia music in favor of Christian talk on June 5, 2017. The Legends music format continued to stream online for several years, apparently with many of the same hosts and with the support of the same advertisers. However in 2017, the nostalgia music online provided by K.A.A.M. Online was completely discontinued. Radio station KAAM continues to broadcast over-the-air and online as a Christian radio station only.

On July 11, 2025, Donald B. Crawford, Jr. donated the KAAM license valued at $1,885,128 to First Dallas Media, the owner of Christian-formatted KCBI-FM 90.9. The deal did not include KAAM's tower site as it was sold separately. As a result, KAAM went silent. The call sign was changed to KCBI on September 23, 2025.

On August 14, 2026, First Dallas Media announces plans to simulcast KCBI-FM's HD2 signal, which is their "All Teaching Channel" once they build new facilities by this Fall.
