= John Witherspoon College =

Non-denominational Christian liberal arts college in Rapid City, South Dakota

Coordinates: 44°04′28″N 103°17′12″W

- Motto: Fides Quaerens Intellectum
- Type: Private
- Established: 2007; 19 years ago
- Affiliations: Non-denominational
- Head: C. Richard Wells
- Faculty: 8
- Location: Rapid City, South Dakota
- Campus: Urban
- Website: www.jwc.edu

John Witherspoon College was a non-denominational Christian liberal arts college in Rapid City, South Dakota. The college was founded in 2012 and named after the pastor, scholar and American Founding Father John Witherspoon. The college was created to serve both a local need for Christian higher education in the Black Hills and the broader interest for classic liberal-arts education in America.

== History ==
In 2004, the Black Hills Bible Institute was founded by members of South Canyon Baptist Church in Rapid City, South Dakota. Its chief instigator was Dr. C. Richard Wells, a member of the founding faculty of Beeson Divinity School, former President of Criswell College, and the Pastor of South Canyon Baptist Church from 2004 to 2009. The purpose of the institute was to offer affordable, academic theological training in the Black Hills to students, including those transferred from other conforming Christian colleges. In 2009, Dr. Wells accepted an offer to be the Dean of Chapel at Union University in Jackson, Tennessee and in 2011 returned to Rapid City to restructure the Black Hills Bible Institute into John Witherspoon College, where he was president until 2019.

On August 21, 2012, John Witherspoon College began its first classes. The Inaugural Convocation took place on the campus on September 6 with city mayor Sam Kooiker as the keynote speaker. US Senator John Thune was the keynote speaker of the annual ScholarShare Banquet the following spring.

For the tax year of 2012, the college had an income of about $255,000.

In April 2024, the college announced that it would close the next month; according to president John Swann, the closure was due to a lack of funding and support from the local community.

== Accreditation ==
In fall 2014, the college announced that it had applicant status with the Transnational Association of Christian Colleges and Schools (TRACS), a Christian accrediting body recognized by the US Department of Education. The college achieved accredited status in April 2017.

== Campus ==
John Witherspoon College previously co-located with the BigHorn Canyon Community Church and later with the RealLife Church of the Nazarene. In August 2023, the campus was relocated to 640 East St. Patrick St., Rapid City SD 57701. This move expanded the college's ability to host events and administer its programs without sharing the location with another entity.

== Cultural events ==
John Witherspoon College has hosted various events, including bringing performers such as Michael Card and Ballet Magnificat! to perform in Rapid City. It has also hosted the Visio Dei conference for pastors and ministers and other events to support community involvement and improvement.
