= East of Yesterday =

Studio album by the Hangdogs
- Released: 1998
- Genre: Country, rock
- Label: Crazyhead
- Producer: Bruce Henderson

The Hangdogs chronology
Same Old Story (1997)	East of Yesterday (1998)	Beware of the Dog (2000)

East of Yesterday is an album by the New York City band the Hangdogs, released in 1998. It was rereleased by Shanachie Records the following year. A video was shot for "Hey, Janeane", which starred Janeane Garofalo; the song was a hit on Americana radio stations.

== Production ==
The album was produced by Bruce Henderson, who gave it a raw, garage sound. The majority of the album's songs were written by frontman Matthew Grimm.

"The Ring" is about a country fan who sells his record collection to buy an engagement ring; the song inspired a fan in Dallas to propose to his girlfriend and to arrange for a Hangdogs concert to follow his wedding reception.

== Critical reception ==
Professional ratings
Review scores
Source	Rating
AllMusic	4/5 stars
Courier News	3/4 stars
MusicHound Rock: The Essential Album Guide	3.5/5 stars
Richmond Times-Dispatch	3/4 stars

No Depression wrote that, "while the songs exhibit cleverness and irony, they aren't mere novelty numbers, either in their lyrics or their tone." The Washington Post thought that "the best part of the disc is Grimm's lyrics, for he has a storyteller's gift for making the listener want to know what happens next."

The Austin Chronicle called Grimm "as playful a lyricist as Tom T. Hall," writing that East of Yesterday "offers a generous helping of wise-guy roots-rock, that bracing sub-subgenre created at the street corner of the mind where Youse meets Y'all." USA Today deemed the album "surprisingly twang-core, notable for a confident, unhurried delivery." The Courier News determined that the band "clearly has a good sense of humor, but there's lots of blue-collar, heartfelt sincerity."

The Ottawa Citizen listed the 1999 rerelease as one of the year's best country albums, writing that "this New York foursome is both humorous and frighteningly perceptive in its commentary on contemporary relationships and life." The Fort Worth Star-Telegram concluded that East of Yesterday is "country and rock, not the hyphenated, homogenized country-rock that everyone with a cowboy hat, a pick and a Gram Parsons disc burned off Napster is playing these days."

== Track listing ==
No.	Title	Length
1.	"Once More's Gone"
2.	"Hey, Janeane"
3.	"Speed Rack"
4.	"Drift"
5.	"Something Left to Save"
6.	"The Ring"
7.	"I'd Call to Say I Love You..."
8.	"The Man with the Plan That Went Awry"
9.	"High and Dry"
10.	"In My Dreams"
11.	"They Don't Play No Country on the East Side of New York"
