= First Baptist Academy of Dallas =

School in Dallas, Texas, US

First Baptist Academy

Location
- 7894 Samuell Blvd. Dallas, TX 75228; United States; 32.784059°N 96.799931°W

Information
- Motto: Since 1972 ... education of distinction with an eternal perspective
- Established: 1972
- Head of school: Jason Lovvorn
- Grades: PK3–12
- Enrollment: Approx. 250
- Average class size: 17
- Mascot: Saints
- Accreditations: SACS, ACTABS
- Affiliation: First Baptist Church, Dallas
- Website: www.fbacademy.com

First Baptist Academy of Dallas (commonly FBA) is a private, Biblically integrated, college preparatory Christian school located in Dallas, Texas. First Baptist Academy opened for grades K-7 on September 5, 1972, previously in Downtown Dallas. It is now located at a new campus in East Dallas, at the current Saints Athletic Complex.

== History ==
=== Founding ===
First Baptist Academy was founded as a private Baptist Christian School. Originally a centralized campus of FBCD, it was based in the Downtown Dallas area for over four decades.

FBA's inaugural date was September 5, 1972, commencing with Pre and Primary Grades. Subsequently, Lower and Upper Secondary Grades were introduced through single grade additions, in sequential ascending order, annually. By 1977, FBA graduated its first Senior Class.

=== School leadership ===
Brian Littlefield served as the head of the school until 2014 when he became the head of Central Texas Christian School. At that time Jason Lovvorn, an alumnus who began working at First Baptist in 2008, became the head of the school.

== School ==
FBA's student body is organized in three schools (Elementary, Middle, and High School).

FBA offers AP courses in the following subjects: English, Math, Science, History, Government and Politics, and Macroeconomics. FBA also provides a fine arts curriculum including choir, band, and art.

FBA is accredited by the Southern Association of Colleges and Schools, the Accrediting Commission of the Texas Association of Baptist Schools, and AdvancEd.

== Athletics ==
The 22-acre (8.9 ha) Saints Athletic Complex is located just east of downtown Dallas.

FBA competes in TAPPS 2A and fields teams in the following sports.

First Baptist Academy Saints Athletic Complex, Coordinates 32.792152°N 96.679195°W

Fall Sports

- Cheerleading
- Football
- Volleyball
- Dance Team

Winter Sports

- Basketball
- Cheerleading
- Swimming
- Wrestling

Spring Sports

- Baseball
- Golf
- Softball
- Tennis
- Powerlifting, THSPA
- Track & Field

The Saints varsity football team claimed its first TAPPS Division III Championship in 2013.
