= Mac Brunson =

American minister

- Born: Donald McCall Brunson; September 20, 1957 (age 68); Greenwood, South Carolina, U.S.
- Occupation: Pastor
- Spouse: Debbie Brunson
- Children: Courtney, Trey, Wills
- Website: inlight.org

Donald McCall "Mac" Brunson (born September 20, 1957) is an American Baptist minister who was the senior pastor of the First Baptist Church in Jacksonville, Florida, a Southern Baptist Convention (SBC) megachurch. Previously, he served as senior pastor of the First Baptist Church in Dallas, Texas, and in 2018 took over as the senior pastor of Hoover, Alabama's Valleydale Church.

== Career ==
Brunson was born in the small town of Greenwood, South Carolina, the youngest of three children. He helped out in his father's retail furniture store and played football in high school. He became convinced of the truth of his religion at the age of 12 while at a summer camp run by the church. Brunson decided to become a minister during his freshman year at North Greenville College, where he completed his associate degree. He then obtained a B.A. at Furman University in Greenville. He studied at Southwestern Baptist Theological Seminary where he earned his Master of Divinity degree in 1985 and his Doctor of Ministry degree in 1991. Thereafter, he became pastor of South Norfolk Baptist Church in Chesapeake, Virginia, and then Green Street Baptist Church in High Point, North Carolina.

In 1999 Brunson was appointed senior pastor of the historic First Baptist Church in Dallas, Texas. He was president of the Southern Baptist Convention Pastor's Conference in 2003. He moved to Jacksonville, Florida in February 2006 to replace retiring pastor Jerry Vines as senior pastor of First Baptist Church in Jacksonville. At that time the Jacksonville church had 28,000 members and occupied eleven blocks of downtown. On May 6, 2018, Brunson preached his last sermon as senior pastor of First Baptist Church Jacksonville. On July 22, 2018 Brunson started preaching at another Southern Baptist church, Valleydale Church in Hoover, Alabama.

== Activities ==
In 2006 Brunson joined Jacksonville Mayor John Peyton, Congressman Ander Crenshaw and Senator Bill Nelson in a Memorial Day ceremony. On Jacksonville's 2007 Day of Faith in September 2007 he called on anyone who wanted to pray for solidarity against crime. The previous year the event had been sponsored by the city, but this time it was purely arranged by the churches.

In April 2009 a police detective who is also a member of Brunson's security detail investigated the website of a blogger critical of Brunson's $300,000 salary and other perks. Discussing the accusations, Brunson said he was one of the lowest-paid mega-church pastors in the Southern Baptist Convention. The anonymous blogger's name was revealed to the church, and a trespass warning was issued that banned the longtime member and his wife from First Baptist. The blogger later filed a lawsuit against First Baptist and Brunson, claiming they committed fraud and misrepresented events, and that the pastor made malicious and false statements. In April 2012 the defamation lawsuit was settled under confidential terms. Brunson made a public apology for his statements, in which he had called the blogger "obsessive compulsive" and a "sociopath".

Brunson is a supporter of the Institute for Creation Research (ICR). At the 2009 annual Pastors Conference held at First Baptist Church, Jacksonville, the ICR gave away some 6,000 books and magazines promoting creationism and criticizing belief in evolution. In May 2010 Brunson called on Southern Baptist pastors to follow the Great Commission in proclaiming the gospel everywhere they go in order to stem the considerable decline in church membership. Brunson is the founder of Inlight Ministries, which broadcasts his message around the country. Inlight also provides podcasts via iTunes.

=== Ordinance 2012-296 ===
In 2012, Brunson was a vocal opponent of Ordinance 2012-296, a bill that if passed would have added sexual orientation, gender identity, and gender expression to the City of Jacksonville's Human Rights Commission. Adding this wording would have established protections for those stated groups in the areas of employment, housing, and public accommodations. In an August 7, 2012 opinion piece in the Florida Times-Union, Brunson wrote, "With the left hand, City Council wants us to believe it is concerned with the rights of the church. Yet with the right hand, council reveals its true intention — requiring Christians to subordinate their faith to the dictates of government steered by a rabid minority". On an August 15 vote, the original and altered form of the bill failed to pass the city council. City council members that voted down the bill were later honored at a First Baptist Church service, Brunson as the presiding pastor.

== Bibliography ==
- Mac Brunson, Donald Brunson (2004). The miracle you've been searching for (Miracles Can Still Happen Series). Moody Publishers. ISBN 0-8024-1375-7.
- Mac Brunson, Ergun Caner (2005). Why Churches Die: Diagnosing Lethal Poisons in the Body of Christ. B&H Publishing Group. ISBN 0-8054-3181-0.
- Mac Brunson (2005). The God You've Been Searching For. Moody Publishers. ISBN 0-8024-1373-0.
- James W. Bryant, Mac Brunson (2007). The New Guidebook for Pastors. B&H Publishing Group. ISBN 978-0-8054-4429-2.
- Mac Brunson (2010). Paralyzed by Fear Or Empowered by Hope: A Fresh Look at Psalm 23. NavPress. ISBN 978-1-61521-563-8.
