= KTON (940 AM) =

Belton, Texas; United States
- Broadcast area: Killeen–Temple, Texas
- Frequency: 940 kHz
- Branding: Country Legends

Programming
- Format: Defunct

Ownership
- Owner: JLF Communications, LLP

History
- Call sign meaning: Belton, Texas

Technical information
- Facility ID: 60091
- Class: D
- Power: 1,000 watts (day); 5 watts (night)
- Transmitter coordinates: 31°02′37″N 97°24′46″W

KTON (940 AM) was a radio station in Belton, Texas, United States, serving the Killeen–Temple area. The station's broadcast license was most recently held by JLF Communications, LLP. Prior to shut down, it was a simulcast of KTFW-FM 92.1 in Glen Rose, Texas.

In March 2009, the Commission learned that the station fell silent on December 30, 2008, when the owner of the transmitter site seized control of the transmitter and dismantled the station's broadcast towers after KTON failed to make required rent payments. The station formally notified the Federal Communications Commission (FCC) that they had fallen silent on March 9, 2009. The station applied to the FCC for special temporary authority to remain silent which was then granted.

An application to change the station's frequency to 950 kHz and the city of license to Kaufman, Texas, was submitted in July 2009. The Commission accepted the application for filing but never formally approved the move.

As of June 2010, KTON is no longer licensed by the FCC. The FCC revoked KTON's license due to being silent for more than one year and for not notifying the FCC regarding the station being dark in a timely manner. The KTON call sign was deleted from the FCC database on June 2, 2010, and eventually moved to an AM radio station in Cameron, Texas.
