= KCBN (FM) =

Radio station in Whitesboro, Texas

Simulcast of KCBI-FM, Dallas
- Whitesboro, Texas; United States
- Broadcast area: Lake Texoma area
- Frequency: 102.5 MHz

Programming
- Format: Contemporary Christian

Ownership
- Owner: First Dallas Media, Inc.
- Sister stations: KCBI; KCBI-FM; KZBI

History
- First air date: 1985
- Former call signs: KMAD-FM (1985–2026); KZBH (2026)
- Call sign meaning: derived from KCBI

Technical information
- Licensing authority: FCC
- Facility ID: 54812
- Class: C2
- ERP: 18,000 watts
- HAAT: 205 meters (673 ft)
- Transmitter coordinates: 33°41′31″N 96°26′36″W

Links
- Public license information: Public file; LMS

KCBN (102.5 FM) is a contemporary Christian radio station licensed to Whitesboro, Texas, and serving the Lake Texoma area. KCBN is responsible for the activation of the Sherman-Denison metropolitan area Emergency Alert System.

On May 19, 2026, KMAD-FM signed off its "Mad Rock" format (which continues online) as a result of a sale from Connoisseur Media to First Dallas Media and began stunting towards a simulcast of Christian radio-formatted KCBI-FM 90.9 in nearby Dallas under new KZBH call letters. This moved left the Sherman-Denison market without a classic rock station on the FM dial. On June 2, 2026, KZBH swapped call signs with KCBN in Hico.
