= Morris Murdock Travel =

Morris Columbus Travel is a travel agency headquartered in Salt Lake City, Utah, United States, with six additional offices in Utah (Bountiful, Draper, Ogden, Orem and St. George) and Montana (Billings) and home-based agents located throughout Utah, Idaho and Montana. The agency primarily facilitates cruises, escorted tours, group travel, airfare, hotel accommodations, car rentals, full vacation packages, honeymoon/anniversary travel, luxury travel, and incentive travel programs.

== History ==
Morris Murdock Travel began in 1958 when the Church of Jesus Christ of Latter-day Saints (LDS Church) approached Franklin Murdock about starting an agency to handle the travel needs of its employees and missionaries. The modern Morris Murdock Travel is the result of combining multiple other travel companies, including the 1996 merger of Morris Travel and Beehive Tours and Travel and the 2000 merger of Morris Travel and Murdock Travel, among others. The company also developed from several acquisitions including Seattle's Diamond Travel in 1995, Corporate Travel Services in 1996, and Utah's LDS Travel Study, a provider of LDS faith-based travel, in November 2008. In addition, Morris Travel started Morris Air in 1984, which chartered flights to Hawaii and Mexico from Utah. Due to its growth, Morris Air was sold to Southwest Airlines in 1995. Morris Murdock sold its business travel division to Hess Travel in January 2009 in order to better serve its corporate clients.

In 1997, ownership of Morris Travel and Murdock Travel (which stood as two separate companies) belonged to Yamagata Enterprises and the officers of the company, respectively. In 2004, Crestwood Communications, LLC (a subsidiary of Simmons Media Group), took full control of the then-merged Morris Murdock Travel.

In May of 2021 it was announced that Morris Murdock Travel would complete a merger with Columbus Travel, headquartered in Bountiful, Utah, to form one of the largest providers of leisure, meetings, and incentive travel services in Utah and the Intermountain West. The combined companies reported sales exceeding $170 million in 2019.

== Company Divisions ==
- Morris Murdock Escorted Tours (MMET) is the "group travel" department of Morris Murdock Travel which specializes in hosted vacation tours and cruises to destinations using experienced guides and directors. Formed as a separate company in 1958, MMET was the first tour operator to offer Latter-day Saint (Mormon) faith-based and Church History escorted tours.
- Morris Meetings and Incentives' (MMI) was originally started in 1996 as a group leisure branch of Morris Murdock Travel and was formed into a separate company in 1998. The company focuses on specialized programs for incentive groups, meetings, conference and executive retreats. Though MMI's group travel booking experience goes back to the late 1950's, it wasn't formally named a separate entity until the late 1990s. MMI is a multi-year earner of MeetingsNet’s CMI 25 for the top meetings and incentives travel companies in North America.
- Black Pearl Luxury Services is a division of Morris Murdock that focuses on luxury, exotic, F.I.T. (Foreign Independent Travel) and higher-end travel.
- LDS Travel Study (LDSTS) is a sub-company of Morris Murdock Travel that focuses on escorted tours for members of the Latter-day Saint (Mormon) faith. Founded after Brigham Young University closed down their travel department, Morris Murdock purchased LDS Travel Study in November 2008 for an undisclosed amount. A lawsuit between Morris Murdock Travel and former LDS Travel Study owner Doug Wren regarding un-forwarded customer deposits and quarterly revenue percentages was filed in August 2009.
- Jensen Baron Travel Express is an air consolidator sub-company of Morris Murdock Travel formed in 1984.
- SOLO Independent Contractor Program is a program developed by Morris Murdock to provide an avenue of support for independent travel consultants that allows travel agents to create their own "company" under the umbrella of
