= KNON =

Radio station in Dallas

- Dallas, Texas; United States
- Broadcast area: Dallas–Fort Worth metroplex
- Frequency: 89.3 MHz
- RDS: THE VOICE OF THE PEOPLE 89.3
- Branding: KNON 89.3

Programming
- Format: Community radio

Ownership
- Owner: Agape Broadcasting Foundation, Inc.

History
- First air date: August 6, 1983
- Call sign meaning: "Noncommercial"

Technical information
- Licensing authority: FCC
- Facility ID: 601
- Class: C1
- ERP: 55,000 watts
- HAAT: 259 meters (850 ft)
- Transmitter coordinates: 32°35′24″N 96°58′21″W

Links
- Public license information: Public file; LMS
- Webcast: Listen live
- Website: www.knon.org

KNON (89.3 FM) is a community radio station licensed to Dallas, Texas, it serves the Dallas–Fort Worth metroplex and is owned by Agape Broadcasting Foundation, Inc. KNON (for noncommercial) is a non-profit, listener-supported radio station, deriving its main source of income from on-air pledge drives, underwriting or sponsorships by local small businesses, and benefit events. The volunteer disc jockeys play their own music or conduct talk shows. The station's studios and offices are on Colt Road in Dallas, off Interstate 635.

KNON has an effective radiated power (ERP) of 55,000 watts. Its transmitter is on West Belt Line Road in Cedar Hill.

== History ==
KNON originally broadcast at 90.9 MHz. Its predecessor on the frequency was KCHU, a non-commercial station that began broadcasting on August 29, 1975. KCHU operated until August 1977, when it went off the air due to financial shortfalls.

The 90.9 frequency was transferred to Agape Broadcasting as KNON in 1979. The station remained silent through 1980, which was then a license renewal year in Texas. At the time, radio stations operated on a three-year license cycle with the Federal Communications Commission (FCC). By 1984, Criswell Bible Institute (now Criswell College) had begun operating KCBI-FM from a downtown Dallas rooftop with 1,500 watts on 89.3 MHz. The institute wanted to raise the station's power and height and to relocate to the Cedar Hill tower farm where most Dallas-area FM and TV stations have their transmitters.

By the mid-1980s, a number of groups, among which the Criswell Bible Institute was the most prominent, petitioned the FCC to have the 90.9 FM frequency assigned to another broadcaster. Criswell had cited past operational deficiencies on KNON's part as justification for the frequency reallocation. The result was a swap of frequencies between KCBI and KNON in May 1988. The KNON online history museum can be found here.

KNON was the original home for the long-running Church of the Subgenius radio program, Hour of Slack from October 1985 to April 1994 before it moved to WCSB and syndication. The program was discontinued in June 2022.

KNON was picked Best Radio Station in Dallas in 2011 by The Dallas Observer and D-Magazine. In 2012 KNON was picked Best Radio Station for Music by the Dallas Observer.

On the night of October 20, 2019, the KNON studios and offices sustained a direct hit from a tornado, and were heavily damaged. There were no injuries at the station.

== See also ==
- List of community radio stations in the United States
