= KRMX (FM) =

- Bellmead, Texas; United States
- Broadcast area: Waco, Texas
- Frequency: 104.9 MHz (HD Radio)
- Branding: 104.9 Shooter-FM

Programming
- Format: Texas country
- Subchannels: HD2: Cool 101.3 (oldies); HD3: KTON simulcast (sports); HD4: The Beat 107.3 (mainstream urban)
- Affiliations: Clear Media Network

Ownership
- Owner: M&M Broadcasters; (M&M Broadcasters, Ltd., Debtor-in-Possession)
- Sister stations: KBHT; KRZI

History
- First air date: February 29, 1984 (as KYCX Mexia)
- Former call signs: KYCX (1983–1984); KYCX-FM (1984–2005); KWGW (2005–2007); KRQX-FM (2007–2010); KWBT (2010–2014); KBHT (2014–2024)
- Call sign meaning: "Mix" (from former AC format on 92.9)

Technical information
- Licensing authority: FCC
- Facility ID: 21494
- Class: A
- ERP: 2,850 watts
- HAAT: 147 meters (482 ft)
- Transmitter coordinates: 31°38′39″N 96°36′51″W
- Translator: See § Translators

Links
- Public license information: Public file; LMS
- Webcast: Listen live; HD2: Listen live; HD4: Listen live
- Website: www.listentexas.com; HD2: www.centexbeat.com

KRMX (104.9 FM) is a radio station broadcasting a Texas country format. Licensed to Bellmead, Texas, United States, the station serves the Waco area. The station is owned by M&M Broadcasters. Its studios are in Waco, and its transmitter is located on U.S. Highway 84, west of Mexia, Texas.

== History ==
The station was assigned the call sign KYCX on February 28, 1983, and was originally licensed to serve Mexia, Texas. Branded as "Kicks 105", it has programmed country music for the majority of its existence. 104.9 was the original FM sister to 1590 KBHT, which signed on as KBUS in 1956. Matthew and Lisa Groveton signed 104.9 on the air in 1984, simulcasting the AM sister station. On April 4, 1984, the station changed its call sign to KYCX-FM in conjunction with 1590 KBUS dropping its long-time call sign to become KYCX. After over 60 years of localized service to the town of Mexia, big changes were on the horizon for the AM/FM combo. The first of these changes came on September 16, 2005, as 104.9 became a Jack FM style country format, playing a span of several decades, as KWGW "George FM". Along with the suddenly broad playlist and branding change, KWGW discontinued serving the small town of Mexia and began targeting the much larger Waco-Temple market.

On August 23, 2007, 104.9 reverted to KRQX-FM, re-branded to "Q 104.9", and returned to a traditional gold-based country format. .

In 2010, 104.9 went a completely new direction. After 26 years of programming only country music, "104.9 The Beat" debuted with a Hip Hop format, becoming Waco's first ever radio station targeting an Urban audience. On August 27, 2013, the physical plant was relocated out of Mexia, changing its community of license to Bellmead, and signaling the completion of the move-in to Waco. The call sign was soon changed to KWBT, for "Waco's Beat", matching the new brand.

On January 1, 2014, KWBT and 94.5 KBCT swapped formats and calls, with KWBT moving to 94.5 while KBCT went in reverse to the 104.9 signal. It then relaunched as Rhythmic Top 40 "Hot 104.9", quickly requesting another call change to KBHT.

Sometime in August 2015, KBHT let go the entire air staff and flipped from Rhythmic CHR to Urban AC utilizing Westwood One's "The Touch" satellite feed, and entirely adopted it as "Magic 104.9" on October 2.

On August 20, 2016, KBHT changed its format from urban contemporary (which moved to Its HD3 subchannel and the 104.5 translator) to adult contemporary, branded as "Mix 104.9".

On August 29, 2017, KBHT changed its format from adult contemporary to adult hits (format moving from KBHT-HD2), branded as "104.9 Bob FM".

On August 30, 2017, KBHT-HD2 and associated 101.3 translator dropped "Bob FM" and relaunched as a country station named "The Highway" in order to flank sister stations KRMX and KOOV "92.9 & 106.9 Shooter FM", in an attempt to be more competitive against iHeart Media's WACO-FM.

On February 15, 2021, KBHT-HD2 and its 101.3 translator changed their format from country to oldies, branded as "Cool 101.3".

On June 29, 2021, an announcement came that "104.9 Bob FM" has rebranded as "Star 104.9".

On July 2, 2023, KBHT changed its format from adult contemporary to a simulcast of classic country-formatted KEKR (the former KBUS), branded as "Kicker 104.9".

On July 15, 2024, M&M Broadcasters completed the sale of KRMX to First Dallas Media. As a result, the Texas Country format "Shooter-FM" featured on 92.9 was moved to this station. The KRMX callsign from 92.9 was shifted to this facility one week later.

== Translators ==
Broadcast translators for KBHT
Call sign	Frequency	City of license	FID	ERP (W)	HAAT	Class	Transmitter coordinates	FCC info	Notes
K267AI	101.3 FM	Moody, Texas	148790	250	113 m (371 ft)	D	31°32′15″N 97°5′32″W	LMS	First air date: December 12, 2006 (as 90.7 K214EI); rebroadcasts HD2
K230CK	93.9 FM	Waco, Texas	156271	250	113 m (371 ft)	D	31°32′15″N 97°5′32″W	LMS	First air date: December 1, 2014 (as 104.5 K283CD; rebroadcasts HD3
K297CC	107.3 FM	Waco, Texas	156281	250	106 m (348 ft)	D	31°32′15.3″N 97°5′32.9″W	LMS	First air date: December 1, 2014; rebroadcasts HD4
