= KBHT (AM) =

- Mexia, Texas; United States
- Broadcast area: Waco metropolitan area
- Frequency: 1590 kHz
- Branding: Kicker 99.3

Programming
- Format: Classic country

Ownership
- Owner: M&M Broadcasters, Ltd.; (Gary L. Moss)
- Sister stations: KRMX; KRZI

History
- First air date: May 23, 1956 (as KBUS)
- Former call signs: KBUS (1956–1984); KYCX (1984–1987); KRQX (1987–2010); KLRK (2010–2019); KEKR (2019–2024)
- Call sign meaning: "Bellmead Hot" (city of license and former format at 104.9)

Technical information
- Licensing authority: FCC
- Facility ID: 21493
- Class: D
- Power: 2,500 watts day; 65 watts night
- Transmitter coordinates: 31°41′10″N 96°27′18″W
- Translator: See § Translator

Links
- Public license information: Public file; LMS
- Webcast: Listen live
- Website: www.listentexas.com

KBHT (1590 AM "Kicker 99.3") is a commercial radio station, paired with an FM relay translator, broadcasting a classic country radio format. Licensed to Mexia, Texas, the station serves the Waco metropolitan area. The station is owned by M&M Broadcasters, Ltd. Its studios are in Waco, and its transmitter is located in Mexia.

== Translator ==
Broadcast translator for KEKR
Call sign	Frequency	City of license	FID	ERP (W)	HAAT	Class	FCC info	Notes
K257GO	99.3 FM	Waco, Texas	147224	250	126 m (413 ft)	D	LMS	First air date: August 12, 2013 (as 99.1 K256BW)

== History ==
On May 23, 1956, the station signed on as KBUS. It was owned by Bi-Stone Broadcasting, and was a 500 watt daytimer, required to leave the air after sunset.

On February 29, 2012, the then-KLRK changed its format to adult hits, branded as "101.3 Bob FM", also broadcasting on FM translator K267AI 101.3 FM in Moody, Texas.

On February 28, 2013, KLRK changed its format to Regional Mexican music, branded as "La Caliente."

On April 18, 2014, KLRK changed back to dance hits, branded as "101.3 Party".

On February 3, 2015, KLRK changed its format to adult contemporary music and rebranded as "Mix 101.3".

On August 20, 2016, KLRK switched to a simulcast of adult contemporary-formatted KBHT (104.9 FM) in Bellmead. KLRK switched again to adult hits, as "Bob-FM" simultaneously with 104.9 FM. Ironically, 1590 and 104.9 were reunited as a result, having once been independently programmed AM and FM sister stations, owned by the Groveton Family, and still broadcasting from Downtown Mexia.

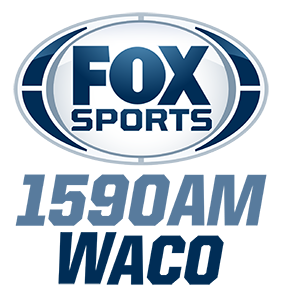
Logo as "Fox Sports 1590"

During the summer of 2018, KLRK began airing the national Fox Sports Radio feed and reimaged as "Fox Sports 1590".

The station changed its call sign to KEKR on November 28, 2019. On January 19, 2020, KEKR changed its format from sports (which moved to KBHT-HD3) to classic country, branded as "Kicker 99.3".

On July 2, 2023, KEKR began simulcasting its classic country format on KBHT and rebranded as "Kicker 104.9".

On July 15, 2024, "Kicker 104.9" reverted to "Kicker 99.3", remaining on this station and its translator, while 104.9 broke away from the simulcast to assume the format and call sign of KRMX (92.9 FM), after that facility was sold to new ownership.
