= Values Voter Summit =

Annual political conference held in Washington, D.C.

- Limit Government • Reduce Spending • Champion Traditional Values • Protect America
- Frequency: Annual
- Locations: Washington, D.C., U.S.
- Inaugurated: September 2006; 20 years ago
- Participants: 2,000
- Website: valuesvotersummit.org

The Values Voter Summit is an annual political conference held in Washington, D.C. for American social conservative activists and elected officials from across the United States.

The Values Voter Summit is hosted by the Family Research Council. There are numerous conservative organizations sponsoring or otherwise participating in the conference. In the 2010 summit, 38 organizations and an audience of 2,000 people participated. The summit is usually held in September or October of each year.

== History ==
The first summit was held in 2006. Among the key issues for values voters defined by the organizers are opposition to abortion and to same-sex marriage, and a strong national defense. The Los Angeles Times describes the conference as combination rally, revival meeting, political convention and bazaar." The conference typically includes appearances from Republican potential presidential candidates vying for the support of the crucial social conservative base of the party.

Featured guests at the summit have included right-wing commentators Sean Hannity, Bill O'Reilly, Ann Coulter, in addition to numerous elected officials and other conservative figures. Co-sponsors of the event included other Christian political action groups, including AFA Action, part of the American Family Association, The Heritage Foundation, Liberty University, Liberty Counsel, and Gary Bauer's organization American Values.

Starting with the second annual conference in 2007, the summit began holding its own presidential straw poll, similarly to the Conservative Political Action Conference (CPAC) and other conferences. The winner of the first presidential straw poll, of about 5,776 votes, was former Massachusetts governor Mitt Romney, who would later go on to be the runner-up of the 2008 primaries before winning the nomination in 2012.

After a "civil war" over the inclusion of the gay Republican group GOProud led many conservative organizations and activists to boycott the 2011 CPAC, Politico reported that a group of conservative figures were beginning to organize to turn the Values Voter Summit into "a full-fledged rival to CPAC" by expanding its focus to include economic and national security issues. Several of the organizations that have been boycotting the CPAC are now sponsors or participants in the Values Voter Summit.

The 2011 conference was held on October 7–8, 2011. All of the major 2012 Republican presidential candidates spoke except Jon Huntsman, Jr. All eight of them were subsequently included in the presidential straw poll, where Texas congressman Ron Paul won. However, his win was discounted by the Family Research Council. Businessman Herman Cain finished second, followed by former Pennsylvania senator Rick Santorum.

The 2013 and 2014 conferences both saw the same two candidates in the top two slots for the presidential straw poll for the first time ever, with Texas senator Ted Cruz and former neurosurgeon Dr. Ben Carson in first and second, respectively. In 2013, Cruz had 42% to Carson's 13%, and in 2014, the gap shortened with Cruz taking only 25% to Carson's 20%. In addition, the 2014 poll marked the first time in the history of the summit that a vice presidential poll was held in addition to the presidential contest. Carson won that poll with 22%, followed by Cruz's 14% and Louisiana governor Bobby Jindal's 11%. With these two polls, Cruz set two records for the summit presidential polls; the first person to win more than one poll, and the highest percentage ever won in any poll since it started in 2007 (with his margin of 42% in 2013).

The 2015 conference (the last one to be held before the 2016 Republican primaries began) was held from September 25 to September 27. This notably coincided with the announcement of the resignation of Speaker of the House John Boehner on the 25th. When Florida Senator Marco Rubio made the announcement, the entire audience erupted into applause at the news. Subsequently, the results of the presidential straw poll saw the same exact top three candidates for the second year in a row: Cruz once again came in first, with Carson in second, and former Arkansas governor Mike Huckabee in third. Businessman Donald Trump, then the frontrunner for the nomination in all major national polls, came in fifth place with only 5% of the vote.

In October 2017, addressing the annual gathering for the third time, President Donald Trump became the first sitting president to do so and spoke for about thirty minutes.

== Conflict with the Southern Poverty Law Center ==
In 2010 the Family Research Council, an important sponsor of the Summit, was included on the Southern Poverty Law Center's list of organizations designated by as anti-LGBT hate groups. The SPLC argues the Family Research Council is trying "to make the case that the LGBT community is a threat to American society" and that Tony Perkins falsely claimed high rates of pedophilia among the LGBT community. In 2012 columnist Dana Milbank, while disagreeing with the Family Research Council, criticized their being so listed as reckless after gunman Floyd Lee Corkins had stated of his attack of the Family Research Council, "Southern Poverty Law lists anti-gay groups. I found them online." The SPLC has defended their own position and in 2017 stated of the Summit itself, "The Values Voter Summit is an annual political conference bringing together some of the most extreme groups on the right, including multiple designated hate groups" and cited the presence of speakers they designate as anti-Islamic along with organizations they deem anti-LGBT hate groups. In 2017 Newsweek also referred to the Summit as a "Hate Group" per the SPLC descriptions.

== Presidential straw polls ==
A presidential straw poll has been held each year since 2007:

- 2007: Mitt Romney, 28%; Mike Huckabee, 27%; Ron Paul, 15%; Fred Thompson, 10%; Rudy Giuliani, 2%; John McCain, 1%.
- 2008: No straw poll was held since the Republican nominee for the 2008 presidential election, John McCain, was already decided. Instead, speakers and attendees expressed support for McCain and his running mate, Sarah Palin.
- 2009: Mike Huckabee, 28%; Mitt Romney, Tim Pawlenty, Sarah Palin, and Mike Pence, 12%.
- 2010: Mike Pence, 24%; Mike Huckabee, 22%; Mitt Romney, 13%; Newt Gingrich, 10%; Sarah Palin, 7%.
- 2011: Ron Paul, 37%; Herman Cain, 23%; Rick Santorum, 16%; Rick Perry and Michele Bachmann, 8%; Mitt Romney, 4%; Newt Gingrich, 3%; Jon Huntsman, Jr., 0%.
- 2012: Again, no straw poll was held as Mitt Romney had already been nominated as the Republican candidate in the 2012 presidential election. Thus, the conference once again simply served for speakers and attendees to express support for Romney and his running mate, Paul Ryan.
- 2013: Ted Cruz, 42%; Ben Carson and Rick Santorum, 13%; Rand Paul, 6%; Marco Rubio, 5%.
- 2014: Ted Cruz, 25%; Ben Carson, 20%; Mike Huckabee, 12%.
  - Vice presidential poll, 2014: Ben Carson, 22%; Ted Cruz, 14%; Bobby Jindal, 11%
- 2015: Ted Cruz, 35%; Ben Carson, 18%; Mike Huckabee, 14%; Marco Rubio, 13%; Donald Trump, 5%

Overall, Mike Huckabee has appeared in more VVS polls than anyone else, with 5 (2007, 2009, 2010, 2014, and 2015). Mitt Romney has the second-highest amount, with 4 (2007, 2009, 2010, and 2011). Two individuals have appeared three times: Ted Cruz and Ben Carson (both in 2013, 2014, and 2015). If the 2014 vice presidential poll is counted, then both Carson and Cruz's totals increase to four each, matching Romney. And five individuals have appeared twice: Ron Paul (2007 and 2011), Mike Pence (2009 and 2010), Newt Gingrich (2010 and 2011), Rick Santorum (2011 and 2013), and Marco Rubio (2013 and 2015).

=== 2011 Ron Paul incident ===
After it was announced that Ron Paul had won the 2011 straw poll with 37% of the vote, it was reported that many of his votes came from the over 600 people who registered just before the poll closed on the second and final day of the conference. Family Research Council president Tony Perkins all but discredited Paul's victory, saying, "I don’t think Ron Paul is truly reflective of where values voters stand." He also said, "Ron Paul bussed in over 600 people not to attend the conference but to hear his speech and vote. I give them credit for being organized."

== See also ==
- Family Research Council
- Faith and Freedom Conference
- Social conservatism in the United States
- Anti-abortion movements

== Gallery ==
2007 Values Voter Summit
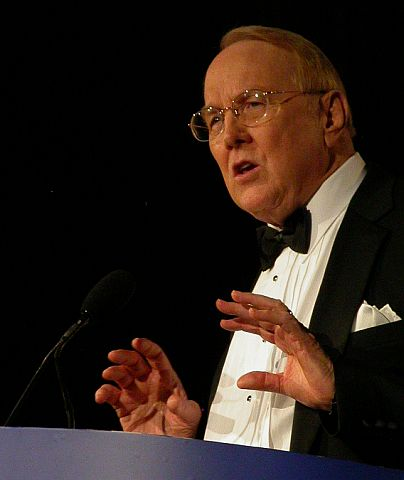
James Dobson

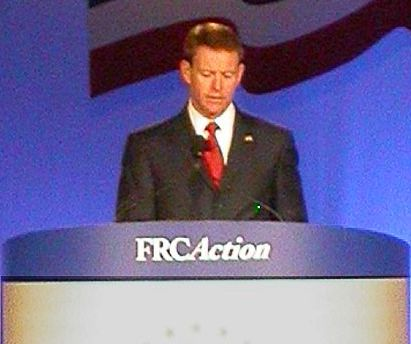
Tony Perkins

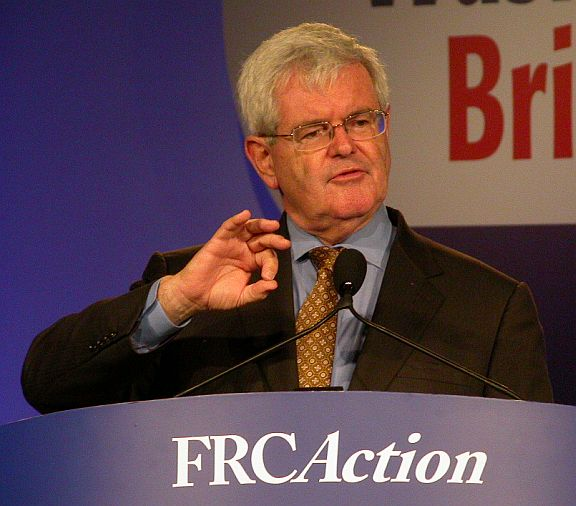
Newt Gingrich

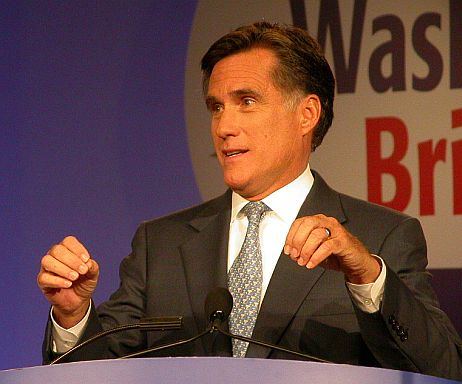
Mitt Romney

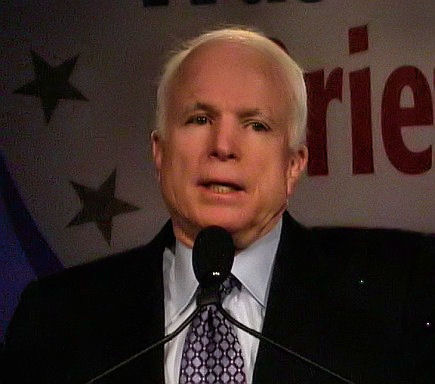
John McCain
