= KZBI (FM) =

Simulcasts KCBI-FM, Dallas, TX
- Marlin, Texas; United States
- Broadcast area: Waco and Temple
- Frequency: 92.9 MHz (HD Radio)

Programming
- Format: Christian radio
- Subchannels: HD2: “KCBI’s All Teaching Channel”

Ownership
- Owner: First Dallas Media Inc.
- Sister stations: KCBI; KCBI-FM; KCBN

History
- First air date: April 2, 1977
- Former call signs: KLMT (1977–1987); KRXX (1987–1990); KEYR (1990–1999); KLRK (1999–2010); KRMX (2010–2024)
- Former frequencies: 96.7 MHz (1977–1989)

Technical information
- Licensing authority: FCC
- Facility ID: 35581
- Class: C2
- ERP: 50,000 watts
- HAAT: 150 meters (490 ft)
- Transmitter coordinates: 31°24′45.00″N 97°12′40.00″W

Links
- Public license information: Public file; LMS
- Webcast: Listen live; HD2: Listen live
- Website: www.kcbi.org

KZBI (92.9 FM) is a non-commercial radio station licensed to Marlin, Texas, United States, serving both the Waco and Temple markets. Owned by First Dallas Media Inc., it is a repeater of Christian radio-formatted KCBI-FM in Dallas, with a mix of Christian adult contemporary and talk/teaching programs.

The transmitter is on Pilgrim Lane, off Interstate 35 in Hewitt.

== History ==
The station signed on the air on April 2, 1977. It began as a Class A station broadcasting at 96.7 MHz. The original call sign was KLMT. On September 18, 1987, the station changed its call sign to KRXX, with a rock format as "K-Rocks". In February 1989, KRXX moved from 96.7 to 92.9. On March 12, 1990, KRXX changed to KEYR, with an adult contemporary format as "Key 92". On August 30, 1999, to KLRK as "Lite Rock 92" and later "Star 92". Then on July 15, 2010, to KRMX as "The Mix". KRMX shifted to a Texas country music format as "Shooter 92.9" in 2012.

In December 2023, the station was sold for $1.35 million to First Dallas Media, Inc. That non-profit organization also owns Christian radio station KCBI in Dallas. FM 92.9 was acquired to give listeners in the Waco and Temple areas access to KCBI's programming. In July 2024, the call letters were switched to KZBI and it started simulcasting KCBI, playing Christian adult contemporary music with some Christian talk and teaching programs as well. The country format previously heard on 92.9 moved to 104.9 KBHT, licensed to Bellmead, Texas, and owned by M&M Broadcasters.
