= KSAO (FM) =

- San Angelo, Texas; United States
- Frequency: 93.9 MHz
- Branding: KCRN 93.9; KHCB Radio Network

Programming
- Language: English
- Format: Christian

Ownership
- Owner: Houston Christian Broadcasters, Inc.

History
- Former call signs: KWLW (1965–1986); KYSD (1986–1988); KTEO-FM (1988–1991); KCRN-FM (1991–2018)
- Call sign meaning: Christian

Technical information
- Licensing authority: FCC
- Facility ID: 14517
- Class: C1
- ERP: 100,000 watts
- HAAT: 198 meters (650 ft)
- Transmitter coordinates: 31°42′11″N 100°19′20″W

Links
- Public license information: Public file; LMS
- Website: https://khcb.org

KSAO (93.9 FM) is an American radio station licensed to serve the community of San Angelo, Texas. The station's broadcast license is held by Houston Christian Broadcasters, Inc.

KSAO broadcasts a Christian radio format to the San Angelo, Texas area.

The station was assigned the call sign "KCRN-FM" by the U.S. Federal Communications Commission (FCC) on September 9, 1991.

Starting on March 19, 2014, KCRN-FM dropped its local origination programming to simulcast from Dallas-based sister station KCBI, now rebranded as KCBI Radio Network. The stations are positioning as "encouraging music & words of hope for Central and West Texas and Southern Oklahoma". It is possible that the Wichita Falls area might join in the simulcast as KSYE changed its callsign to KCBK.

Effective September 7, 2018, KCRN-FM, sister station KCRN, and translator K232FG were sold by First Dallas Media to Houston Christian Broadcasters for $205,000. The station changed its call sign to KSAO the same day.
