= KTON =

- Cameron, Texas; United States
- Frequency: 1330 kHz

Programming
- Format: Religious

Ownership
- Owner: Armor of God Catholic Radio Apostolate

History
- First air date: 1955 (71 years ago) (as KMIL)
- Former call signs: KMIL (1955–2007); KTAE (2007–2012)
- Call sign meaning: Belton (revived after original 940 kHz facility was deleted)

Technical information
- Licensing authority: FCC
- Facility ID: 42367
- Class: D
- Power: 2,400 watts (day); 130 watts (night)
- Transmitter coordinates: 31°6′44.6″N 97°17′49″W
- Translator: K230CH 93.9 (Temple)

Links
- Public license information: Public file; LMS
- Website: Official website

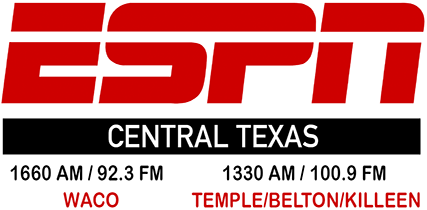
Former logo as ESPN Radio.

KTON (1330 kHz) is a non-commercial educational radio station licensed to Cameron, Texas, broadcasting on an AM frequency of 1330 kHz. The station is currently owned by the Armor of God Catholic Radio Apostolate and serves the Milam County area, including the communities of Temple, Belton, and Killeen.

The station first began broadcasting in 1955 under the call sign KMIL, serving as a local outlet for Milam County. In August 2007, the station transitioned to the call sign KTAE before adopting its current KTON identity on December 17, 2012. The KTON call letters were previously associated with a defunct station on 940 AM in Belton, and the 1330 kHz facility effectively revived the brand in the Central Texas market.

For much of the 2010s and early 2020s, KTON was a commercial sports talk station branded as "ESPN Central Texas." During this time, it functioned as a simulcast of KRZI (1660 AM) in Waco and was an affiliate of the Dallas Cowboys Radio Network.

In 2023, M&M Broadcasters Ltd. reached an agreement to sell the station to the Armor of God Catholic Radio Apostolate. Following the completion of the sale, the station transitioned to a non-commercial religious format as part of the Armor of God Radio Network, an affiliate of EWTN. The current programming schedule includes a mix of live call-in spirituality shows, daily Mass, and religious news such as the Son Rise Morning Show and Catholic Answers Live.

KTON is a Class D AM station that operates with a daytime power of 2,400 watts. To prevent interference with other stations on the 1330 kHz frequency, it reduces its power to 130 watts during nighttime hours The station also broadcasts on an FM translator, K230CH, at 93.9 MHz, which provides improved coverage for listeners in the Temple and Belton areas.
