= Criswell College =

Christian college and divinity school in Dallas, Texas

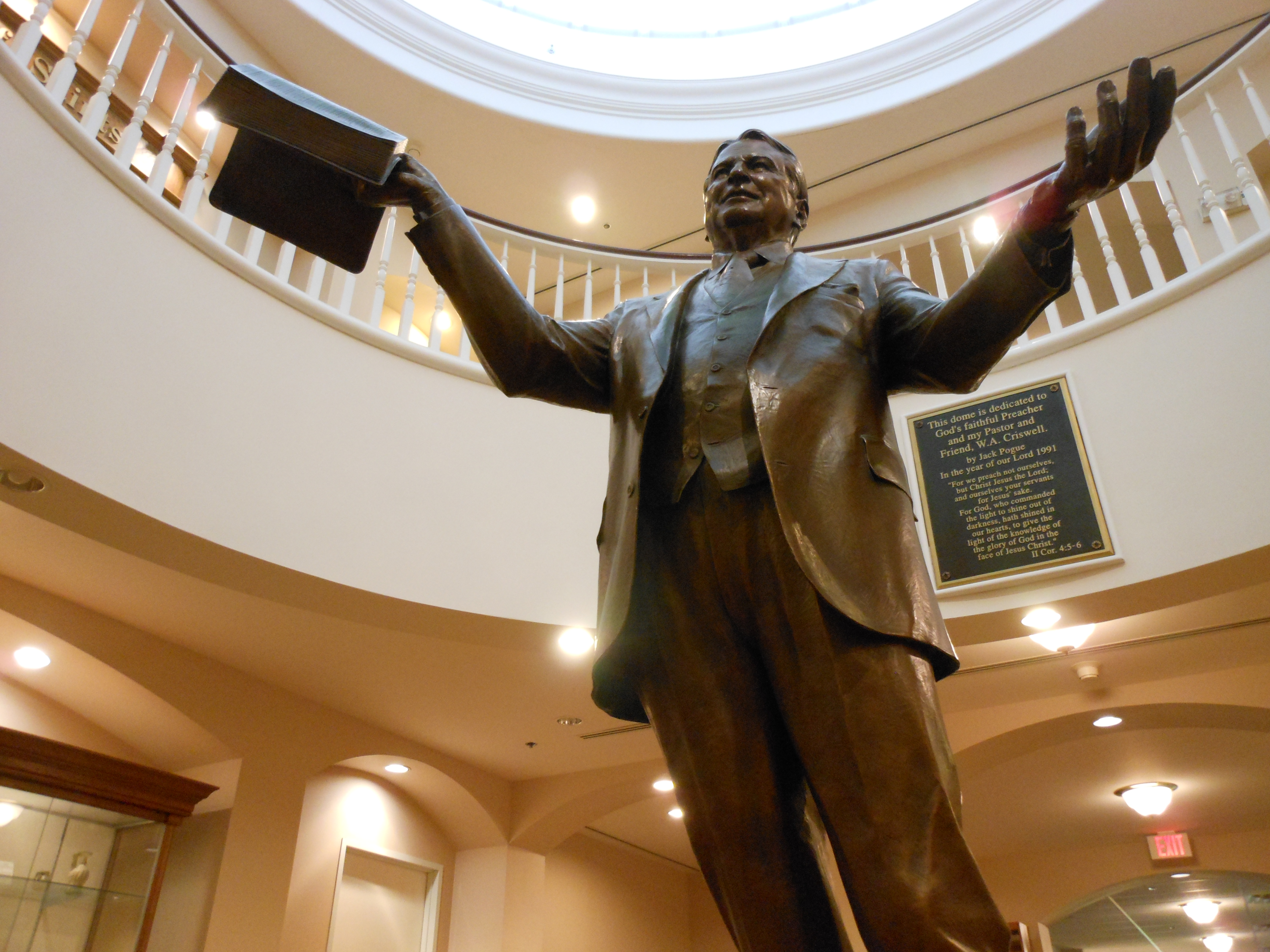
- Statue of W. A. Criswell at Criswell College
- Former names: Criswell Bible Institute; Criswell Center for Biblical Studies
- Type: Private college
- Established: 1970
- President: Barry K. Creamer
- Students: 165
- Location: Dallas, Texas, United States; 32.793°N 96.777°W
- Campus: Urban/Suburban
- Colors: Navy, Gray, Yellow
- Website: www.criswell.edu

Criswell College is a private Baptist Christian college and divinity school in Dallas, Texas. The college's stated mission is to provide ministerial and professional higher education for men and women preparing to serve as Christian leaders throughout society, while maintaining an institutional commitment to biblical inerrancy.

== History ==
Classes began on January 12, 1971, after being founded in 1970 as the Criswell Bible Institute. The school would later be known as the Criswell Center for Biblical Studies before assuming its current name in 1985. The college is named after its founder, W. A. Criswell, long-time pastor of the First Baptist Church of Dallas. James Bryant was the founding dean.

Ruth Ray Hunt, a Dallas citizen with deep religious convictions, provided much of the financial support establishing Criswell College.

The college has been affiliated with the Southern Baptists of Texas Convention since 2001 (SBTC provides some financial assistance and has representation on Criswell's board, but the college is independently owned and operated). The college offers Diplomas, Associate of Arts, Bachelor of Arts, Bachelor of Science, Master of Arts and Master of Divinity degrees.

In 2013, the board of trustees approved plans for an expansion of the undergraduate curriculum and relocation. The expanded curriculum now includes undergraduate majors such as Philosophy, Politics & Economics (PPE), Education, and Psychology.

In 2015 the college applied for an exception to Title IX allowing it to discriminate for religious reasons against students based upon sexual orientation, gender identity, pregnancy, and marital status. In 2016 the organization Campus Pride ranked the college among the worst schools in Texas for LGBT students.

Past presidents include Criswell, H. Leo Eddleman, Paige Patterson, Richard Melick, C. Richard Wells, and Jerry A. Johnson. Barry Creamer is the seventh and current president. Johnson resigned from the college in 2008 citing "philosophical differences with the chancellor and trustee leadership about the future of Criswell College." In a related development in 2010, the school officially separated from First Baptist Church of Dallas. Johnson returned as president later that year before leaving in 2013 to become president and CEO of the National Religious Broadcasters (NRB).

== Articles of faith ==
As a conservative Southern Baptist institution of higher learning, Criswell College holds to the Baptist Faith & Message (2000 edition), with some additional passages reflecting the teachings of Criswell which are still held by the college.

== Accreditation ==
Criswell was first accredited by the Commission on Colleges of the Southern Association of Colleges and Schools (SACS) in 1985.

== Notable alumni ==
- Daniel L. Akin – President, Southeastern Baptist Theological Seminary
- Emir Caner - President, Truett McConnell University
- K. P. Yohannan – President, Gospel for Asia
