= KCBI-FM =

Christian radio station in Dallas

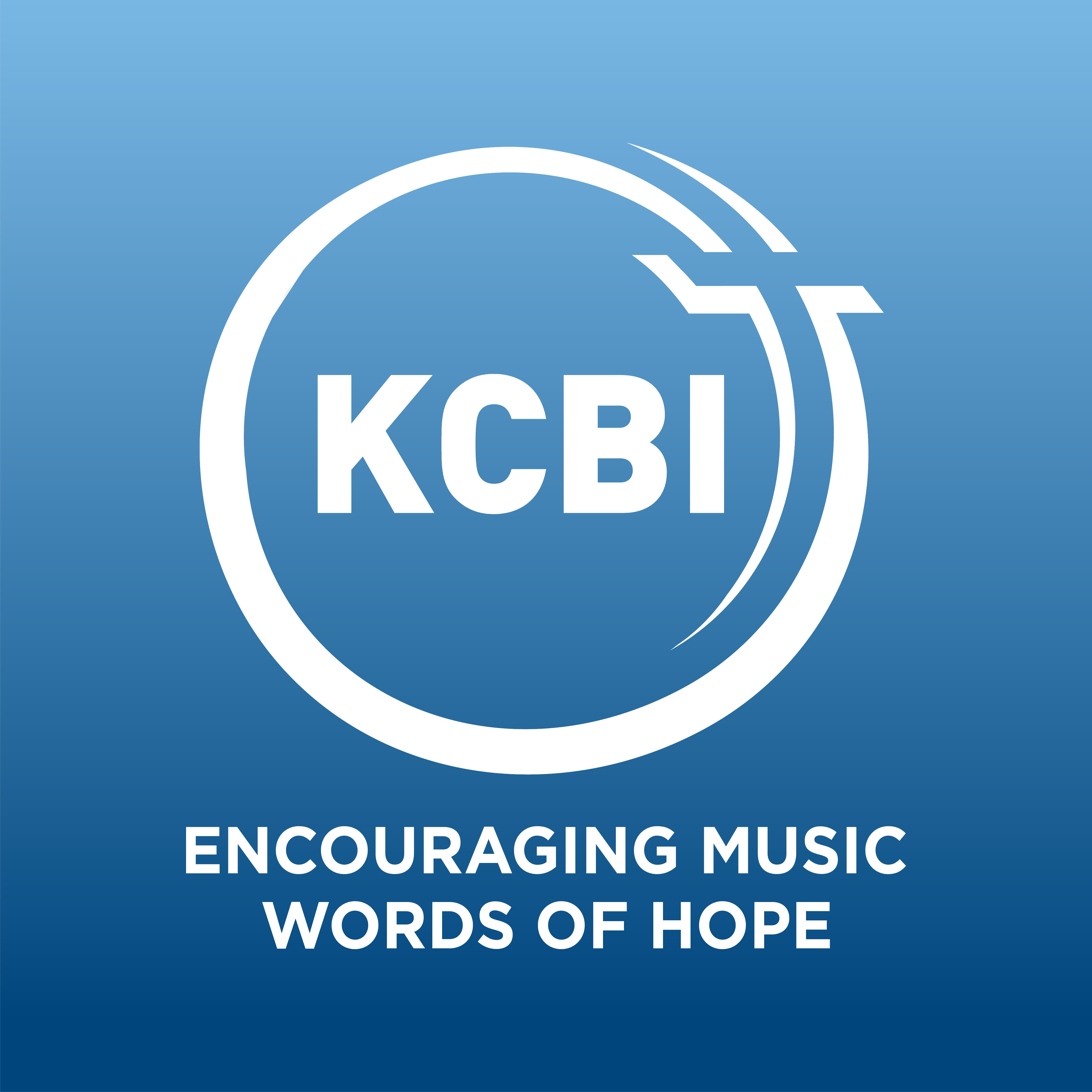
- Dallas, Texas; United States
- Broadcast area: Dallas/Fort Worth Metroplex
- Frequency: 90.9 MHz (HD Radio)
- Branding: 90.9 KCBI FM

Programming
- Format: Christian radio
- Subchannels: HD2: "KCBI’s All Teaching Channel" (Religious)

Ownership
- Owner: First Dallas Media, Inc.
- Sister stations: KCBI; KCBN; KZBI

History
- First air date: May 1976
- Call sign meaning: Criswell Bible Institute, the station's former owner

Technical information
- Facility ID: 14524
- Class: C
- ERP: 100,000 watts
- HAAT: 460 meters (1,510 ft)
- Transmitter coordinates: 32.590°N 96.970°W
- Repeaters: 92.9 KZBI (Marlin); 107.7 KZBH (Hico); 102.5 KCBN (Whitesboro)

Links
- Webcast: Listen live; HD2: Listen live
- Website: www.kcbi.org

KCBI-FM (90.9 FM) is a listener-supported radio station, licensed to Dallas and serving the Dallas-Fort Worth Metroplex in North Texas. It airs a Christian radio format and is owned by First Dallas Media Inc. (FDMI) The station plays Christian adult contemporary music during drive times and middays, with Christian talk and teaching programs in late mornings, evenings and overnight. Programming is largely simulcast on 92.9 KZBI in Waco-Temple, 107.7 KZBH in Hico, and 102.5 KCBN in Whitesboro. The stations are non-commercial and seek donations on the air and on line.

KCBI-FM has an effective radiated power (ERP) of 100,000 watts, the maximum for most FM stations. The transmitter is off West Belt Line Road in Cedar Hill, among the towers for other Dallas-area FM and TV stations.

== History ==
=== KCHU ===
KCBI began with its antenna atop the First International Building in downtown Dallas. Power was 1,500 watts at 660 feet (200 m) above average terrain, a fraction of its current output.

The 90.9 spot traces its beginning to KCHU, a non-commercial FM that went on air August 29, 1975. KCHU operated until September 1977 when it went off air owing to financial shortfalls. The station remained silent through 1980, license renewal year in Texas. (Radio stations then operated on a three-year license cycle.) At the same time, Criswell Bible Institute operated KCBI-FM from a downtown Dallas rooftop with a power of 1,500 watts on 89.3. They aspired to raise power and height by relocating to the Cedar Hill, Texas, tower farm, and applied to take over the 90.9 frequency of KCHU. A legal and FCC struggle ensued. The result was a swap of frequencies, a settlement of litigation, and return of KCHU (renamed KNON) to the air as a new license.

=== Christian teaching and music ===
From the early years through 2012, KCBI was generally programmed as a Christian talk and teaching station. It featured religious leaders with national preaching shows, such as Chuck Swindoll, David Jeremiah, Tony Evans and John MacArthur.

With younger listeners more interested in music than preaching, KCBI began shifting to a ‘more music and personalities’ format in 2013. It plays contemporary Christian artists such as Chris Tomlin, Mercy Me, Casting Crowns and Tobymac. The current version of KCBI's programming offers music and personalities throughout most of the day, and teaching ministries in the evening, night and late morning. Many of its original teaching programs continue to be aired on KCBI.

On September 5, 2017, the First Baptist Church in Dallas, operator of FDMI, ended a 41-year joint management of KCBI with Criswell College (the former Criswell Bible Institute), and became the sole member of FDMI.

KCBI also is involved in community service, including an annual station initiative to provide Bibles to listeners, including in prisons around the DFW area. KCBI was the 2017 National Religious Broadcasters (NRB) "Station of the Year", an honor awarded at the NRB convention in Orlando.

== KCBI personalities ==
Weekday hosts include mornings with Caryn & Jeremy Cruise, middays with Donna Cruz, and afternoons with Dave Moore.

National religious leaders heard on KCBI include Chuck Swindoll, David Jeremiah, Tony Evans, June Hunt, Jim Daly and John MacArthur.

== Other FDMI stations ==
FDMI also owns and operates 107.7 KZBH in Hico, Texas, serving communities southwest of Fort Worth; 92.9 KZBI in Marlin, serving the Waco-Temple radio market;, and 102.5 KCBN in Whitesboro, serving the Sherman–Denison area. In 2025, DJRA Broadcasting donated the license of its own Christian station in the market, KAAM (770 AM), to FDMI; the call sign was changed to KCBI, which required the FM station to add the "-FM" suffix to its call sign. FDMI also has the KCBI All-Teaching Channel, on line and on the HD2 subchannel of KCBI-FM.

FDMI previously owned KCRN-AM-FM in San Angelo, Texas, and KCBK in Frederick, Oklahoma, serving the Lawton/Wichita Falls area. In September 2018, the San Angelo stations were sold for $205,000 to Houston Christian Broadcasters and became KCCE AM and KSAO FM. KCBK, which was silent at the time, was sold the next week to South Central Oklahoma Christian Broadcasting for $250,000.

== HD channels ==
In April 2023, KCBI started fundraising as it was a demand for 24/7 religious talk programming. The days of funding was success. On April 30, 2023, KCBI added HD2 subchannel as "KCBI’s All Teaching Channel". On August 14, 2026, First Dallas Media purchased Dallas FM translator K273BJ (102.5) from Salem Media Group and began simulcasting KCBI's All-Teaching Channel, and revealed plans to also simulcast programming on another recently acquired station KCBI 770 AM by an unspecified date during Fall 2026.
