= List of AM Expanded Band station assignments issued by the Federal Communications Commission on March 17, 1997 =

List of AM Expanded Band station assignments issued by the Federal Communications Commission on March 17, 1997 is a review of the initial eighty-eight assignments, made by the Federal Communications Commission (FCC), for populating in the United States the "Expanded Band" frequencies of 1610 to 1700 kHz, which had been recently added to the AM broadcasting band.

== Background ==
ITU regions and the dividing lines between them. Region 1 Region 2 Region 3

On June 8, 1988, an International Telecommunication Union-sponsored conference held at Rio de Janeiro, Brazil adopted provisions, effective July 1, 1990, to extend the upper end of Region 2's AM broadcast band, by adding ten frequencies which spanned from 1610 kHz to 1700 kHz. The agreement provided for a standard transmitter power of 1 kilowatt, which could be increased to 10 kilowatts in cases where it did not result in undue interference.

The president of WJDM in Elizabeth City, New Jersey, John R. Quinn, was frustrated that this station was limited to daytime-only operation, and required to sign-off at night, because it was located within protected nighttime coverage area of a Class I "clear channel" station, WCKY in Cincinnati, Ohio. In addition, there were no unused fulltime assignments available on the AM and FM bands in the congested New York City region. Quinn saw the pending band extension as an opportunity for WJDM to move to a new frequency allowing fulltime operation, and arranged for congressional representative Matthew J. Rinaldo to introduce legislation that added a carefully worded provision to the Communications Act of 1934 in late 1991, mandating that "It shall be the policy of the Federal Communications Commission, in any case in which the licensee of an existing AM daytime-only station located in a community with a population of more than 100,000 persons that lacks a local full-time aural station licensed to that community and that is located within a Class I station primary service area notifies the Commission that such licensee seeks to provide full-time service". This addition successfully advanced WJDM's status, and on December 8, 1995 the station began broadcasting on the additional frequency of 1660 kHz, as the country's first with regular broadcasting on the expanded band. The wording inserted into the Communications Act was broad enough to qualify a second station, KXBT on 1190 kHz in Vallejo, California, for an expediated assignment, which debuted at 1640 kHz on March 19, 1996.

In the United States, the normal Federal Communications Commission (FCC) practice for station applications on the standard AM band frequencies had been to individually process requests. For the expanded band, the Commission decided to allocate the rest of the band at once on a nationwide basis, after evaluating all of the stations which notified the FCC that they were interested in moving to the new band. In the fall of 1994, the FCC announced that, out of 688 applicants, a specially designed computer program (which took two weeks to run) had chosen 79 stations to make the transfer to the expanded band. However, a year later the Commission rescinded these assignments, after it was determined that there had been major flaws in the data used to evaluate the applications. On March 22, 1996, the FCC announced a revised allocation table, consisting of 87 stations, but this too was eventually withdrawn due to errors.

The FCC's third, and final, allocation was announced on March 17, 1997, and provided for 88 assignments. In most cases the expanded band operations, despite being modifications to existing stations, were licensed as new stations, separately from the original standard band station. With only one exception, only stations included in the March 17, 1997 list have been permitted to operate on an expanded band frequency. The sole exception occurred in 2006, when the FCC granted a waiver giving permission for WRCR in Ramapo, New York to move from 1300 to 1700 kHz.

The FCC originally assumed that the expanded band stations would simulcast the programming of the original standard band stations, and be licensed to the same community. However, in most cases the expanded band stations have run separate programming, and a few have moved to other communities as much as 450 kilometers (280 miles) away. One policy the FCC has generally enforced is that paired original and expanded band stations must remain under common ownership. However, a waiver was granted for 1320/1650 in Fort Smith, Arkansas, where the Commission approved separately owned stations.

In order to allow for an orderly transition period, the FCC initially provided that both the original station and its expanded band counterpart could optionally operate simultaneously for up to five years, after which owners would have to turn in one of the two licenses, depending on whether they preferred the new assignment or elected to remain on the original frequency. However, the FCC has repeatedly extended this deadline, and reported that as of October 2015 there were 25 cases where co-owned standard band and expanded band stations were still active, some of which were approaching 20 years of operation. This report also noted that:

A total of 88 Expanded Band channels were originally allotted. There were 67 applications filed for Expanded Band allotments, of which 66 construction permits were granted, with one application still pending. Licenses were granted to 54 stations that migrated from the standard AM band to the Expanded Band. Of those, 22 unconditionally surrendered their standard band licenses and remained in the Expanded Band; three conditionally surrendered their standard band licenses, and four standard band licenses were canceled by the Commission. The Commission also received one unconditional surrender of an Expanded Band authorization and one conditional surrender, and it canceled one Expanded Band license.

In one case a multi-year deleted expanded band station, WJCC on 1700 kHz in Miami Springs, Florida, was relicensed. WJCC was deleted on February 23, 2006, however, because numerous other joint standard/expanded band station pairs had been permitted to operate beyond the initial five-year deadline, a petition to resume operations was granted, with WJCC's license restored on October 4, 2012.

== Table of March 17, 1997 assignments ==
Review of the 88 Expanded Band authorizations made by the Federal Communications Commission on March 17, 1997. In the table below:

- For the "Existing Standard Band Station Which Received the Authorization" entries, the FCC's March 17, 1997 notification listed station's call signs and frequencies as of June 30, 1993, dating to when the stations initially notified the commission that they were interested in participating.
- "FCC Appl.: BP#" refers to the identifier assigned by the FCC to the 67 applications that were filed for authorizations to construct the Expanded Band station. These identifiers were assigned on the day the application was received, and were given a prefix of "BP-". An "n/a" entry indicates the 21 cases where, despite being authorized, no application was ever filed to construct the Expanded Band station. "Fac. ID#" is the unique Facility Identifier assigned by the FCC.
- "CP" refers to an FCC Construction Permit issued where an application to build the Expanded Band station was approved.
- Cells for stations that are still licensed are highlighted with a beige background.

March 17, 1997 Expanded Band Authorizations					Existing Standard Band Station Which Received the Authorization			
Freq.	FCC Appl.: BP# Fac. ID#	CP Initial Call Sign	Current Status		Call Sign	Community of License	Freq.	Current Status
1610 (1)	BP-970519AB; 86827	KNRB (January 21, 2000)	Deleted July 18, 2005 (KALT Atlanta, Texas)		KALT	Atlanta, Texas	900	KPYN Atlanta, Texas
1620 (12)	BP-970611AF; 87034	WPHG (November 12, 1997)	WNRP Gulf Breeze, Florida	"	WGYJ	Atmore, Alabama	1590	Deleted September 11, 1998 (WGYJ Atmore, Alabama)
1620 (12)	BP-970611AH; 87036	KSMH (February 17, 1998)	KSMH West Sacramento, California		KAHI	Auburn, California	950	KAHI Auburn, California
1620 (12)	BP-970616AT; 87152	KBLI (November 10, 1997)	Deleted February 7, 2006 (KBLI Blackfoot, Idaho)		KECN	Blackfoot, Idaho	690	Deleted September 4, 2025 (KEII Blackfoot, Idaho)
1620 (12)	BP-970613AG; 87112	WJVA (March 6, 1998)	Deleted April 15, 2019 (WDND South Bend, Indiana)		WAMJ	South Bend, Indiana	1580	WHLY South Bend, Indiana
1620 (12)	BP-970613AF; 87113	n/a	CP cancelled December 22, 2000.		KHRT	Minot, North Dakota	1320	Deleted February 27, 2025 (KHRT Minot, North Dakota)
1620 (12)	BP-970616BP; 87182	KAZP (January 9, 1998)	KOZN Bellevue, Nebraska		KKAR	Bellevue, Nebraska	1180	KZOT Bellevue, Nebraska
1620 (12)	BP-970616AG; 87149	n/a	Application cancelled March 11, 2025.		WJRZ	Toms River, New Jersey	1550 (CP)	CP cancelled September 14, 1995 (WJRZ Toms River, New Jersey)
1620 (12)	BP-970613AL; 87125	KBAG (March 6, 1998)	CP cancelled January 9, 2001 (KNNT Farmington, New Mexico)		KENN	Farmington, New Mexico	1390	KENN Farmington, New Mexico
1620 (12)	BP-970613AO; 87120	WAZG (March 23, 1998)	CP cancelled January 29, 2001 (WAZG Myrtle Beach, South Carolina)		WKZQ	Myrtle Beach, South Carolina	1520	WWHK Myrtle Beach, South Carolina (1450 kHz)
1620 (12)	BP-970616AS; 87145	KAZW (January 9, 1998)	WTAW College Station, Texas		WTAW	College Station, Texas	1150	KZNE College Station, Texas
1620 (12)	BP-970613AC; 87117	WDHP (March 6, 1998)	WDHP Frederiksted, U.S. Virgin Islands		WRRA	Frederiksted, U.S. Virgin Islands	1290	Deleted February 8, 2011 (WRRA Frederiksted, U.S. Virgin Islands)
1620 (12)	BP-970527AE; 86941	KYIZ (February 23, 1998)	KYIZ Renton, Washington		KRIZ	Renton, Washington	1420	KRIZ Renton, Washington
1630 (6)	n/a				KWFM	Tucson, Arizona	940	KGMS Tucson, Arizona
1630 (6)	BP-970616BO; 87162	KBEG (May 15, 1998)	CP cancelled January 15, 2004 (KOME Clovis, California)		KOQO	Clovis, California	790	KFPT Clovis, California
1630 (6)	BP-970616BD; 87174	WAWX (January 9, 1998)	Deleted February 13, 2020 (WRDW Augusta, Georgia)		WRDW	Augusta, Georgia	1480	Deleted February 5, 2015 (WCHZ Augusta, Georgia)
1630 (6)	BP-970613AD; 87115	KCJK (November 10, 1997)	KCJJ Iowa City, Iowa		KCJJ	Iowa City, Iowa	1560	Deleted May 7, 2002 (KCJK Iowa City, Iowa)
1630 (6)	BP-970616AE; 87147	KBCM (March 6, 1998)	KKGM Fort Worth, Texas		KHVN	Fort Worth, Texas	970	KHVN Fort Worth, Texas
1630 (6)	BP-970616AO; 87155	KKWY (November 21, 1997)	KFBU Fox Farm, Wyoming		KSHY	Fox Farm, Wyoming	1530 (CP)	Deleted March 18, 2019 (KJUA Cheyenne, Wyoming, 1380 kHz)
1640 (11)	n/a				KBLU	Yuma, Arizona	560	KBLU Yuma, Arizona
1640 (11)	BP-970613AK; 87108	KDIA (April 17, 1998)	KDIA Vallejo, California		KNBA	Vallejo, California	1190	KDYA Vallejo, California
1640 (11)	BP-970616AM; 87159	WTNI (December 13, 2002)	Deleted June 23, 2025 (WTNI Biloxi, Mississippi)		WVMI	Biloxi, Mississippi	570	Deleted June 26, 2003 (WVMI Biloxi, Mississippi)
1640 (11)	BP-970616BE; 87166	WLHJ (November 10, 1997)	CP cancelled December 22, 2000 (WLHJ Mount Airy, North Carolina)		WSYD	Mount Airy, North Carolina	1300	WSYD Mount Airy, North Carolina
1640 (11)	n/a				KLXX	Bismarck-Mandan, North Dakota	1270	KLXX Bismarck-Mandan, North Dakota
1640 (11)	n/a				WTRY	Troy, New York	980	WOFX Troy, New York
1640 (11)	BP-970616BI; 87168	KBFQ (May 15, 1998)	KZLS Enid, Oklahoma		KCRC	Enid, Oklahoma	1390	KCRC Enid, Oklahoma
1640 (11)	BP-970424AC; 86618	KKJY (October 20, 1997)	KPAM Lake Oswego, Oregon		KPHP	Lake Oswego, Oregon	1290	Deleted February 23, 2006 (KKSL Lake Oswego, Oregon)
1640 (11)	n/a				KURV	Edinburg, Texas	710	KURV Edinburg, Texas
1640 (11)	BP-970613AQ; 87119	KBJA (August 10, 1998)	KBJA Sandy, Utah		KTKK	Sandy, Utah	630	Deleted September 28, 2017 (KTKK Sandy, Utah)
1640 (11)	BP-970613AN; 87121	WAZI (March 23, 1998)	WSJP Sussex, Wisconsin		WKSH	Sussex, Wisconsin	1370	Deleted December 15, 1999 (WAZI Sussex, Wisconsin)
1650 (8)	BP-970613AE; 87114	KHFS (November 10, 1997)	KFSW Fort Smith, Arkansas		KWHN	Fort Smith, Arkansas	1320	KWHN Fort Smith, Arkansas
1650 (8)	BP-970612AE; 87242	KGXL (March 12, 1998)	KFOX Torrance, California		KOJY	Costa Mesa, California	540	Deleted August 15, 2000 (KKGO Costa Mesa, California)
1650 (8)	BP-970616AP; 87151	KBJD (August 10, 1998)	KBJD Denver, Colorado		KRKS	Denver, Colorado	990	KRKS Denver, Colorado
1650 (8)	BP-970616AF; 87148	WAZJ (March 23, 1998)	CP cancelled January 15, 2004 (WAZJ Atlanta, Georgia)		WAOK	Atlanta, Georgia	1380	WAOK Atlanta, Georgia
1650 (8)	BP-970616AN; 87158	KDNZ (August 3, 1998)	KCNZ Cedar Falls, Iowa		KCFI	Cedar Falls, Iowa	1250	KCFI Cedar Falls, Iowa
1650 (8)	n/a				KTMT	Phoenix, Oregon	880	Deleted March 13, 2023 (KCMX Phoenix, Oregon)
1650 (8)	BP-970616BL; 87165	KBIV (September 4, 1998)	KSVE El Paso, Texas		KSVE	El Paso, Texas	1150	KHRO El Paso, Texas
1650 (8)	BP-970616BF; 87170	WAWT (January 9, 1998)	WJFV Portsmouth, Virginia		WPMH	Portsmouth, Virginia	1010	Deleted January 3, 2024 (WHKT Portsmouth, Virginia)
1660 (12)	n/a				WKRG	Mobile, Alabama	710	WNTM Mobile, Alabama
1660 (12)	BP-970616AY; 87180	KAXW (January 9, 1998)	KBRE Merced, California		KLOQ	Merced, California	1580	Deleted August 13, 2004 (KVVY Merced, California)
1660 (12)	BP-970530AC; 86909	WMIB (February 17, 1998)	WCNZ Marco Island, Florida		WMIB	Marco Island, Florida	1480	Deleted June 3, 2021 (WVOI Marco Island, Florida)
1660 (12)	BP-970616AJ; 87143	KBJC (August 10, 1998)	KWOD Kansas City, Kansas		WREN	Topeka, Kansas	1250	KYYS Kansas City, Kansas
1660 (12)	BP-970626AA; 87325	WQSN (October 1, 1998)	WZOX Kalamazoo, Michigan		WQSN	Kalamazoo, Michigan	1470	Deleted February 20, 2006 (WKLZ Kalamazoo, Michigan)
1660 (12)	BP-970611AG; 87037	WBHE (September 4, 1998)	Deleted August 24, 2022 (WJBX Charlotte, North Carolina)		WGIV	Charlotte, North Carolina	1600	Deleted June 2, 2004 (WGIV Charlotte, North Carolina)
1660 (12)	BP-970616AD; 87146	KQJD (February 9, 1998)	KQWB West Fargo, North Dakota		KQWB	West Fargo, North Dakota	1550	Deleted June 8, 2001 (KQJD West Fargo, North Dakota)
1660 (12)	BP-970613AM; 87123	WBAH (May 11, 1998)	WWRU Jersey City, New Jersey		WJDM	Elizabeth, New Jersey	1530	Deleted April 10, 2020 (WJDM Elizabeth, New Jersey)
1660 (12)	n/a				KSLM	Salem, Oregon	1390	KZGD Salem, Oregon
1660 (12)	BP-970616AH; 87150	WGIT (December 14, 2000)	WGIT Canovanas, Puerto Rico		WCHQ	Camuy, Puerto Rico	1360	Deleted April 5, 2004 (WCHQ Camuy, Puerto Rico)
1660 (12)	BP-970616AW; 87179	KAXY (January 9, 1998)	KRZI Waco, Tex		KRZI	Waco, Texas	1580	Deleted May 18, 2006 (KQRL Waco, Texas)
1660 (12)	BP-970613AT; 87107	KBDF (March 23, 1998)	Deleted August 17, 2015 (KXOL Brigham City, Utah)		KSOS	Brigham City, Utah	800	Deleted September 2, 2004 (KSOS Brigham City, Utah)
1670 (8)	BP-970616AQ; 87156	KSUL (August 26, 1999)	KHPY Moreno Valley, California		KHPY	Moreno Valley, California	1530	Deleted October 29, 2003 (KHPI Moreno Valley, California)
1670 (8)	BP-970616BB; 87171	KAZT (January 9, 1998)	KQMS Redding, California		KHTE	Redding, California	600	Deleted June 25, 2001 (KAZT Redding, California)
1670 (8)	n/a				KCOL	Fort Collins, Colorado	1410	KIIX Fort Collins, Colorado
1670 (8)	BP-970613AI; 87110	WAXP (March 6, 1998)	WMGE Dry Branch, Georgia		WRCC	Warner Robins, Georgia	1600	Deleted January 10, 2002 (WAXP Warner Robins, Georgia)
1670 (8)	BP-970616AZ; 87173	WAWR (January 9, 1998)	CP cancelled December 22, 2000 (WAWR Salisbury, Maryland)		WLVW	Salisbury, Maryland	960	WTGM Salisbury, Maryland
1670 (8)	n/a				KBTN	Neosho, Missouri	1420	KBTN Neosho, Missouri
1670 (8)	n/a				KKEL	Hobbs, New Mexico	1480	Deleted July 2, 1999 (KKEL Hobbs, New Mexico)
1670 (8)	BP-970616AL; 87154	WAWY (January 9, 1998)	WOZN Madison, Wisconsin		WTDY	Madison, Wisconsin	1480	WLMV Madison, Wisconsin
1680 (11)	BP-970616AV; 87176	(January 9, 1998)	KGED Fresno, California		KXEX	Fresno, California	1550	KXEX Fresno, California
1680 (11)	n/a				KSTR	Grand Junction, Colorado	620	KJOL Grand Junction, Colorado
1680 (11)	BP-970616BM; 87164	WTIR (April 12, 1999)	WOKB Winter Garden, Florida		WXTO	Winter Garden, Florida	1600	WLAA Winter Garden, Florida
1680 (11)	n/a				KJCK	Junction City, Kansas	1420	KJCK Junction City, Kansas
1680 (11)	BP-970616BJ; 87167	KBJE (September 4, 1998)	KRJO Monroe, Louisiana		KMLB	Monroe, Louisiana	1440	Deleted March 4, 2008 (KMLB Monroe, Louisiana)
1680 (11)	BP-970612AC; 87106	WBHD (September 4, 1998)	WPRR Ada, Michigan		WSFN	Muskegon, Michigan	1600	Deleted March 3, 2008 (WMHG Muskegon, Michigan)
1680 (11)	n/a				KBRF	Fergus Falls, Minnesota	1250	KBRF Fergus Falls, Minnesota
1680 (11)	BP-970613AH; 87111	WAXK (March 6, 1998)	WTTM Lindenwold, New Jersey		WHWH	Princeton, New Jersey	1350	WHWH Princeton, New Jersey
1680 (11)	n/a				WKTP	Jonesborough, Tennessee	1590	WKTP Jonesborough, Tennessee
1680 (11)	n/a				KBNA	El Paso, Texas	920	KQBU El Paso, Texas
1680 (11)	BP-970616AU; 87153	KAZJ (January 9, 1998)	KNTS Seattle, Washington		KZOK	Seattle, Washington	1590	KLFE Seattle, Washington
1690 (8)	BP-970616AX; 87177	KSXX (November 17, 1997)	KFSG Roseville, California		KRCX	Roseville, California	1110	KLIB Roseville, California
1690 (8)	BP-970501AA; 86619	KAYK (November 10, 1997)	KDMT Arvada, Colorado		KQXI	Arvada, Colorado	1550	Deleted November 18, 2003 (KADZ Arvada, Colorado)
1690 (8)	BP-970613AR; 87118	WAXD (January 9, 1998)	WMLB Avondale Estates, Georgia		WBIT	Adel, Georgia	1470	Deleted February 18, 2005 (WBIT Adel, Georgia)
1690 (8)	n/a				KILR	Estherville, Iowa	1070	KILR Estherville, Iowa
1690 (8)	BP-970616AB; 87178	WHTE (June 5, 1998)	WVON Berwyn, Illinois		WDDD	Johnston City, Illinois	810	Deleted July 31, 2012 (WDDD, Johnston City, Illinois)
1690 (8)	BP-970613AJ; 87109	WAZC (March 6, 1998)	WPTX Lexington Park, Maryland		WPTX	Lexington Park, Maryland	920	Deleted November 16, 1999 (WPTX Lexington Park, Maryland)
1690 (8)	n/a				KLAT	Houston, Texas	1010	KLAT Houston, Texas
1690 (8)	BP-970616AR; 87157	WIGT (August 12, 2010)	WIGT Charlotte Amelie, U.S. Virgin Islands		WGOD	Charlotte Amalie, U.S. Virgin Islands	1090	Deleted September 23, 2019 (WUVI, Charlotte Amalie, U.S. Virgin Islands)
1700 (11)	BP-970616AK; 87141	WEUV (August 7, 2000)	WEUP Huntsville, Alabama		WEUP	Huntsville, Alabama	1600	WHIY Huntsville, Alabama
1700 (11)	n/a				KNST	Tucson, Arizona	790	KNST Tucson, Arizona
1700 (11)	n/a				KQKE	Soledad, California	700	KMBX Soledad, California
1700 (11)	BP-970616BG; 87169	WCMQ (December 5, 1997)	WJCC Miami Springs, Florida (Deleted February 23, 2006, but relicensed on October 4, 2012.)		WCMQ	Miami Springs, Florida	1210	WNMA Miami Springs, Florida
1700 (11)	BP-970612AD; 87105	KBGG (November 12, 1997)	Deleted March 31, 2026 (KBGG Des Moines, Iowa)		KKSO	Des Moines, Iowa	1390	Deleted February 2, 2001 (KKSO Des Moines, Iowa)
1700 (11)	BP-970616BK; 87163	WAYU (March 6, 1998)	CP cancelled December 22, 2000 (WAYU Rochester, New Hampshire)		WZNN	Rochester, New Hampshire	930	WPKX Rochester, New Hampshire
1700 (11)	BP-970616BK; 87163	WAYU (March 6, 1998)	This assignment was subsequently occupied, effective July 13, 2015, by WRCR, Ramapo, New York.		WZNN	Rochester, New Hampshire	930	WPKX Rochester, New Hampshire
1700 (11)	BP-970611AI; 87039	KCHT (December 22, 1997)	CP cancelled January 15, 2004 (KCHT Astoria, Oregon)		KAST	Astoria, Oregon	1370	KAST Astoria, Oregon
1700 (11)	n/a				KKLS	Rapid City, South Dakota	920	KKLS Rapid City, South Dakota
1700 (11)	BP-970616AI; 87142	KQXX (March 6, 1998)	KVNS Brownsville, Texas		KBOR	Brownsville, Texas	1600	Deleted February 17, 2005 (KQXX Brownsville, Texas)
1700 (11)	BP-970508AC; 86684	KTBK (June 1, 1998)	KTNO Richardson, Texas		KDSX	Denison-Sherman, Texas	950	Deleted January 10, 2006 (KZRA Denison-Sherman, Texas)
1700 (11)	BP-970616BA; 87172	WEZI (November 17, 1997)	CP cancelled January 16, 2004 (WEZI Harrisonburg, Virginia)		WSVA	Harrisonburg, Virginia	550	WSVA Harrisonburg, Virginia

== See also ==
- AM expanded band#Implementation
- 1610 AM#United States
- 1620 AM#United States
- 1630 AM#United States
- 1640 AM#United States
- 1650 AM#United States
- 1660 AM#United States
- 1670 AM#United States
- 1680 AM#United States
- 1690 AM#United States
- 1700 AM#United States
