= WGOD =

WGOD could refer to two radio stations in the United States Virgin Islands:

- WGOD-FM, a radio station (97.9 FM) licensed to serve Charlotte Amalie, U.S. Virgin Islands
- WUVI (AM), a radio station (1090 AM) licensed to serve Charlotte Amalie, U.S. Virgin Islands, which held the call sign WGOD from 1989 to 2012
