= WGOD-FM =

Radio station in Charlotte Amalie, U.S. Virgin Islands

- Charlotte Amalie, U.S. Virgin Islands; United States
- Frequency: 97.9 MHz
- Branding: WGOD Radio

Programming
- Format: Religious
- Affiliations: 3ABN

Ownership
- Owner: North Caribbean Conference of Seventh-Day Adventists, Inc. and Xnull; (North Caribbean Conference of SDA Broadcasting Corp.)

History
- First air date: 1979
- Former call signs: WIBS (1974–1985); WGOD (1985–1989)
- Call sign meaning: Where God Offers Deliverance

Technical information
- Licensing authority: FCC
- Facility ID: 66979
- Class: B
- ERP: 50,000 watts
- HAAT: 475 meters (1,558 ft)
- Transmitter coordinates: 18°21′25″N 64°58′0″W

Links
- Public license information: Public file; LMS
- Webcast: Listen live
- Website: wgodradio.org

WGOD-FM (97.9 FM) is a radio station licensed to serve Charlotte Amalie, U.S. Virgin Islands. The station is owned by the North Caribbean Conference of Seventh-day Adventists.

WGOD-FM airs a religious radio format featuring a mix of teaching programs and Christian music. The station receives the majority of its programming as part of the Three Angels Broadcasting Network.

== History ==
WGOD-FM operated under the call letters WIBS from its initial licensing in 1979 until August 13, 1985, when it became WGOD. It added an -FM suffix to the call sign on October 5, 1989, becoming WGOD-FM, so that the WGOD call letters could be assigned to a co-owned AM station.

In 2020 it was announced that WGOD-FM was being acquired from Three Angels Broadcasting Network by the North Caribbean Conference of Seventh-day Adventists, with Three Angels Broadcasting Network retaining ownership of WIGT.
