= WJCC =

WJCC may refer to:

- WJCC (AM), a radio station (1700 AM) licensed to serve Miami Springs, Florida, United States
- World Junior Curling Championships
- Western Joint Computer Conference
- Williamsburg-James City County Public Schools, Virginia
