= WEXY =

- Wilton Manors, Florida; United States
- Broadcast area: Fort Lauderdale
- Frequency: 1520 kHz

Programming
- Format: Gospel; brokered programming

Ownership
- Owner: Multicultural Broadcasting; (Multicultural Radio Broadcasting Licensee, LLC)
- Sister stations: WJCC, WNMA

History
- First air date: June 1963; 62 years ago
- Former call signs: WIXX (1962–1970)

Technical information
- Licensing authority: FCC
- Facility ID: 9730
- Class: B
- Power: 5,000 watts day; 800 watts night
- Transmitter coordinates: 26°10′26.00″N 80°9′27.00″W

Links
- Public license information: Public file; LMS

WEXY (1520 AM) is a radio station broadcasting an urban contemporary gospel format, with some paid brokered programming on religion, health and other topics. Licensed to Wilton Manors, Florida, United States, the station serves the Fort Lauderdale area. The station is currently owned by Multicultural Radio Broadcasting Licensee, LLC. The original callsign was WIXX. The station had once been co-owned with WIXX-FM, now WBGG-FM.

== History ==
In addition to WEXY 1520 AM, Multicultural Broadcasting also operates two sister stations in Miami/Dade County, WNMA 1210 AM and WJCC 1700; both stations serve their listening areas with a mix of Hispanic and Haitian cultural music and talk programming. WNMA was a onetime ESPN Deportes Radio outlet, but the ESPN programming moved to Radio Actualidad's 990 WMYM.

WEXY first went on the air in June 1963, starting out as the AM sister station to Fort Lauderdale's WAXY-FM 105.9, then known as WFLM, which is now known as WBGG "Big 106".

According to a 1990 Sun Sentinel Newspaper interview, WEXY had its roots in the 1960s, when WEXY's owner, Juno Beattie, then operating a beauty shop in Durham, North Carolina, met Jim Beattie, who then owned Durham's top rated rock radio station. They met when Jim attempted to get Juno's shop to buy spots on the station.

== The 1970s and 1980s ==
The Beattie's then purchased additional stations in North Carolina, Virginia, and Daytona Beach, Florida. In 1970, they (operating as "Celebrities, Inc.") purchased 1520 AM, a low wattage country station, in Wilton Manors, Florida, which served the Fort Lauderdale metro area with a 1,000 watt signal as WIXX 1520 "The Top Gun in Broward."

They eventually changed the calls to WEXY and flipped through several formats, running "Easy Listening," "Beautiful Music," "Solid Gold," and "Good Modern Music" (a mix of current hits and Golds) formats, and finally, back to country music. For a time, the station ran a "Hit Parade" syndicated package produced by San Diego's Drake-Chenault programming team, which was designed for automated radio stations.

WEXY eventually lost their county audience to competition from the county formats on the stronger signals of 560 WQAM, and WIRK 107.9 FM, which began running country music in September 1973. The audience erosion led to the station adopting a brokered black gospel talk and music format in 1976, similar in style to WSWN "Sugar 900" to the north in Belle Glade.

Domestic problems caused Jim and Juno Beattie to split in 1982. Following their divorce, Juno relocated to Melbourne, Florida. When Jim died from cancer in November 1988, he turned over the ownership of WEXY 1520 to Juno. She returned the station to a full-time black gospel outlet by 1990.

In October 1989, WEXY received clearance to increase from 1,000 to 3,500 watts.

== The 2000s ==
By 2003, Juno Beattie sold WEXY to MRBI Broadcasting, Inc. of New York City, which flipped the station to a Hispanic Christian Music and Talk format "The Voice of Hope" ("La Voz, de la Esperanza") while also running Asian-based sports broadcasts.

An eventual mid-2000s increase to 5,000 watts allowed the station to cover Dade, Broward, Southern Palm Beach Counties and Freeport in the Grand Bahamas. The station currently brands itself as "The Spirit of South Florida" with a mix of brokered black gospel church talk programs and black gospel music filling out its unsold airtime.

In 2015, the WEXY made the local news when the family of the stations' program director, Doug DeVos, became an alleged victim of a funeral home scam.

In late 2017, the bankrupt and long off the air WFLL 1400 AM (the old, iconic WFTL 1400) began duplexing (renting tower space and transmitter facilities) on one of two of WEXY's towers in Oakland Park, Florida. The City of Oakland Park maintains a manicured Dog Park around WEXY's main quad-post tower. WFLL 1400, an old James Crystal Radio property, is owned by Jorgensen Broadcasting, a radio brokerage firm.
