= WCHQ =

WCHQ may refer to:

- WNTC (AM), a radio station (790 AM) licensed to serve Ashland City, Tennessee, United States, which held the call sign WCHQ in 2021
- WXND-LP (Kentucky), a low-power radio station (100.9 FM) licensed to serve Louisville, Kentucky, United States, which held the call sign WCHQ-LP from 2014 to 2020
- WDNO, a radio station (960 AM) licensed to serve Quebradillas, Puerto Rico, which held the call sign WCHQ from 2004 to 2011
- WDIN, a radio station (102.9 FM) licensed to serve Camuy, Puerto Rico, which held the call sign WCHQ-FM from 1978 to 1997
- WCHQ (Puerto Rico), a defunct radio station (1360 AM) licensed to Camuy, Puerto Rico, from 1970 to 2004
