= KKEL =

KKEL may refer to:

- KKEL (TV), a television station (channel 27) licensed to serve Ely, Nevada, United States; see List of television stations in Nevada
- KKEL (AM), a defunct radio station (1480 AM) formerly licensed to serve Hobbs, New Mexico, United States
