= KKOL (AM) =

Radio station in Seattle, Washington

- Seattle, Washington; United States
- Broadcast area: Seattle metropolitan area
- Frequency: 1300 kHz
- Branding: AM 1300 The Answer

Programming
- Format: Conservative talk radio
- Affiliations: Salem Radio Network Townhall

Ownership
- Owner: Salem Media Group; (Inspiration Media, Inc.)
- Sister stations: KGNW

History
- First air date: May 23, 1922
- Former call signs: KDZE (1922–1924); KFOA (1924–1928); KOL (1928–1975); KMPS (1975–1997)
- Former frequencies: 833 kHz (1922–1923); 660 kHz (1923–1927); 670 kHz (1927–1928); 1270 kHz (1928–1941)

Technical information
- Licensing authority: FCC
- Facility ID: 20355
- Class: B
- Power: 35,000 watts (day); 3,200 watts(night)
- Transmitter coordinates: 47°39′18.3″N 122°31′10.5″W

Links
- Public license information: Public file; LMS
- Webcast: Listen Live
- Website: theanswerseattle.com

KKOL (1300 kHz) is an AM radio station in Seattle, Washington. It is owned by Salem Media Group. It airs a conservative talk radio format, branded as "1300 The Answer," featuring nationally syndicated Salem Radio Network hosts including Dennis Prager, Mike Gallagher, Sebastian Gorka, Hugh Hewitt, Brandon Tatum and Charlie Kirk. The radio studios and offices are on Fifth Avenue South. KKOL is the oldest radio station in Seattle, first licensed on May 23, 1922.

The transmitter site is on North Madison Avenue on Bainbridge Island, co-located with KLFE 1590 AM. By day, KKOL transmits 35,000 watts, using a two-tower array directional antenna. At night it switches to non-directional operation, but to protect other stations on 1300 AM from interference, it reduces power to 3,200 watts.

== History ==
=== KDZE ===
KKOL was first licensed, with the sequentially assigned call letters KDZE, on May 23, 1922. It was owned by the Rhodes Company Department Store at 1321 Second Avenue in Seattle. In the early days of broadcasting, some stations were owned by department stores and electronics stores, to promote the sale of receivers.

C. B. Williams, the department store's advertising manager, coordinated the installation of the initial 50-watt transmitter. The station's glass-enclosed studio was located on the second floor of the store, where shoppers could observe its operation.

At this time there was only a single wavelength, 360 meters (833 kHz) available for "entertainment" broadcasts, so KDZE was required to make a time-sharing agreement with the other stations already in operation. On June 23, Seattle stations were scheduled to operate from noon to 10:30 pm, with KDZE assigned the 3:30 to 4:15 p.m time period.

In May 1923, the U.S. Commerce Department, which regulated radio at this time, made a range of frequencies available to "Class B" stations that had higher powers and better programming. The Seattle region was initially assigned 610 kHz, with 660 kHz assigned to Portland. These two assignments were soon swapped, and in the summer of 1923 KDZE moved to 660 kHz.

=== KFOA ===
In early 1924, in conjunction with an upgrade in facilities, the station's call sign was changed to KFOA. At this time the department store was issued a license to operate a second radio station, with 100 watts on 1110 kHz, which inherited the original KDZE call letters. This second KDZE was primarily used to broadcast the weekly Chamber of Commerce luncheons, and was deleted in March 1925.

On November 11, 1928, under the provisions of a major reallocation resulting from the Federal Radio Commission's (FRC) General Order 40, KFOA was reassigned from 660 kHz to 1270 kHz, sharing the assignment with KTW (now KKDZ).

=== KOL ===
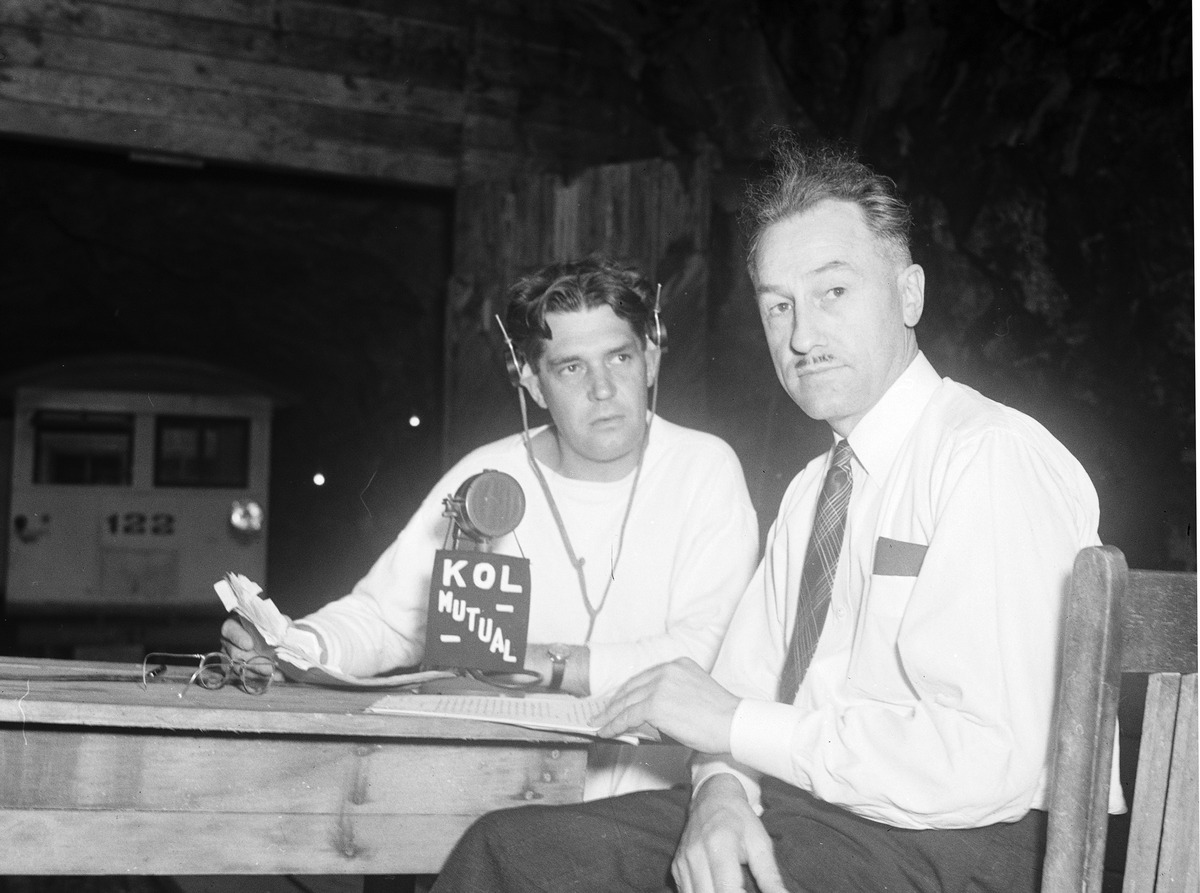
KOL radio broadcast with announcer Dudley Williamson and Seattle City Light Superintendent Eugene Hoffman, 1939

The next month the station was sold to the Seattle Broadcasting Company, headed by Archie Taft, with the call letters changing to KOL. The studios were moved to the Northern Life Tower. In 1931, KTW moved to 1220 kHz, giving KOL unlimited use of 1270 kHz.

From 1930 to 1938, KOL was Seattle's CBS Radio Network affiliate. In 1934 the station abandoned the T-wire antenna on the Rhodes Department Store building's roof, moving to a new transmitter site on Harbor Island, which featured a 490-foot (150 m) self-supporting tower, which at the time was the tallest of its type in the United States. The studios were moved to the transmitter site in 1952.

In 1941, the North American Regional Broadcasting Agreement (NARBA) was enacted. On March 29, 1941, KOL, along with all the other stations on 1270 kHz, moved to 1300 kHz.

In 1962, the Taft interests sold KOL to television producers and game show moguls Mark Goodson and Bill Todman. KOL briefly adopted a Top 40 format which was dropped within a year due to the strong ratings of Top 40 leader AM 950 KJR, and reverted to a Middle of the Road (MOR) format. By 1965, KOL's Top 40 format had returned. In 1967, the station was sold to Buckley Broadcasting. From 1965 to 1975, KOL, favoring more progressive rock programming, battled KJR as the number-one popular music station in Seattle.

=== KMPS ===
In 1975, the format flipped to country music. The call sign was changed to KMPS (for "Kountry Music Puget Sound") following another change in ownership. The country format was also added to 94.1 KMPS-FM (now KSWD and formerly KOL-FM) in February 1978. The Harbor Island studio and transmitter site was demolished in 1981.

While KMPS-FM concentrated on contemporary country music with continuous music sweeps, KMPS 1300 had more personality and a playlist with older country hits.

=== KKOL ===
After then-owners EZ Communications sold AM 1300 KMPS to Salem Communications in December 1996, the station's call sign was changed to KKOL in 1997, and a conservative talk format was adopted at that time.

In 2002, after losing its transmitter site, KKOL installed a temporary 1,000-watt transmitter on a moored 175-foot (53-meter) cargo ship, and began to operate from a Seattle waterway. This was the only floating broadcasting station antenna in the U.S. This unique configuration was used for almost five years.

In 2007, a new 50,000-watt transmitter was built. However, there was a complaint from a nearby U.S. Oil and Refining petroleum facility about the transmitter. There was concern that its proximity to the refinery produced electrical fields that exceeded safe limits at the loading docks, creating a potential source of ignition for the combustibles handled there. In particular, there was concern that a spark caused by the flow of radio frequency (RF) energy (a high-frequency alternating current) within cranes, acting as receiving antennas, could trigger an explosion. (This issue is a rarity in broadcast engineering, though a similar situation regarding fuel occurred at AM 1010 KIQI in Oakland, California.)

U.S. Coast Guard standards specified that materials may not be handled with a signal strength of greater than 0.7 volts per square meter (700mV/m^{2}), while the industry recommendation is 0.5V/m^{2}. U.S. Oil's request was for the station to introduce a null toward the facility. However this was in the direction of downtown Seattle, which would necessitate a waiver of the regulation which requires radio stations to cover their community of license with a grade A "city-grade" signal. In addition, the proposed pattern had the effect of reducing KKOL's potential audience by 700,000 listeners.

=== Business news and conservative talk ===
On November 3, 2008, KKOL switched from its news/talk format to all-business radio. A portion of the station's programming was derived from Bloomberg Radio and CNBC.

In May 2018, Salem agreed to swap KKOL to Tron Dinh Do's Intelli LLC in exchange for KPAM in Troutdale/Portland, Oregon. Salem had been operating KPAM via a local marketing agreement (LMA) since March 2018. KPAM is conservative talk "860 The Answer" with much of the same programming as "1590 The Answer" KLFE in Seattle.

KKOL went silent on February 28, 2018, following the loss of its transmitter site, and need to find a new site to resume broadcasting. After a year of being silent while the station changed transmitter locations to Bainbridge Island, KKOL signed back on in February 2019, playing contemporary Christian music, before going silent again in September 2019.

In June 2021, KKOL returned to the air simulcasting KNTS. The simulcast was then changed to KLFE in October 2021. On August 1, 2022, KKOL became the originating station of the conservative talk format. Effective December 1, 2022, Intelli LLC sold KKOL to Salem Media Group for $500,000.

== See also ==
- List of initial AM-band station grants in the United States
