= KTNO =

KTNO may refer to:

- KTNO (AM), a radio station (1700 AM) licensed to Richardson, Texas, United States
- KTNO (Plano, Texas), a defunct radio station (620 AM) licensed to Plano, Texas, United States, which held the call sign KTNO from 2019 to 2026
- KEXB (AM), a radio station (1440 AM) licensed to University Park, Texas, United States, which held the call sign KTNO from 1997 to 2019
- KAMM (AM), a radio station (1540 AM) licensed to University Park, Texas, which held the call sign KTNO from 1993 to 1997
