= WNMA =

Radio station in Miami Springs, Florida

- Miami Springs, Florida; United States
- Broadcast area: Miami metropolitan area
- Frequency: 1210 kHz
- Branding: Radio Mundo 1210

Programming
- Language: Spanish
- Format: Talk radio

Ownership
- Owner: Multicultural Broadcasting; (Multicultural Radio Broadcasting Licensee, LLC)
- Sister stations: WEXY, WJCC

History
- First air date: April 10, 1949
- Former call signs: WFEC (1949–1961); WMBM (1961–1962); WMET (1962–1965); WOAH (1965–1969); WLTO (1969–1972, 1973–1974); WCMQ (1972–1973, 1974–1997)
- Former frequencies: 1220 kHz (1949–1985)

Technical information
- Licensing authority: FCC
- Facility ID: 61642
- Class: B
- Power: 47,000 watts (day); 2,500 watts (night)
- Transmitter coordinates: 25°54′0.00″N 80°21′49.00″W

Links
- Public license information: Public file; LMS
- Website: radiomundomiami.com

WNMA (1210 AM) is a radio station licensed to Miami Springs, Florida, serving the Miami metropolitan area. It airs a Spanish talk radio format. The station is owned by Multicultural Broadcasting and currently operated by Adrian Pontes.

It broadcasts with 47,000 watts during the day and 2,500 watts at night. The signal can be received from as far north as Jupiter to as far south as the upper Florida keys. The nighttime directional pattern of WNMA protects 1210 in Philadelphia, a Class A 50,000-watt station.

== History ==
=== WFEC and WMBM ===
WFEC signed on April 10, 1949. The daytime-only outlet broadcast on 1220 kHz and was owned by the Florida East Coast Broadcasting Company. However, Florida East Coast reached a deal by the end of 1949 to sell the station to Howard B. Steere, an advertising executive from Detroit. Early in 1950, an attempt made before the station had signed on to move it to 1230 kHz, thereby allowing it to broadcast at night, was denied by the Federal Communications Commission (FCC); in 1951, Steere asked to move WFEC to 1240 kHz, which would also allow it nighttime operation, but the move was dismissed a year later.

Steere sold WFEC in 1952 to David Haber, owner of an automobile repair company and a fleet of taxi cabs in New York, for the same purchase price he had paid two years ago—$50,000. Haber then filed to obtain a construction permit for a television station on channel 10 the next year, proposing to co-locate the TV transmitter with the radio station at 350 NE 71st Street. With five other applicants seeking the channel, Haber dropped out in November.

Under Haber and continuing under the second Florida East Coast Broadcasting Company, station programming was primarily aimed at a Black audience. As early as December 1952, WFEC promoted itself in trade advertising as "the only station in Florida featuring all-negro programming". Robert Earl Sawyer hosted a weekly program, "Negro Review", on WFEC in 1952. 1957 brought King Coleman, formerly of Tampa's WIOK. When the station gained a competitor—WMBM (800 AM, later 790 AM)—in the mid-1950s, it also lost DJ Milton Smith, known as the "Fat Daddy"; WFEC continued to promote a "Fat Daddy Show" with another DJ, while WMBM promoted Smith as the "Original Fat Daddy".

In 1955, WFEC and two other Miami stations—WMBM and WAHR—came under scrutiny by the FCC for their airing of programs by "tipsters" claiming to help listeners predict—and bet on—horse race winners. The stations won license renewals after removing the programs. The station was sold later in the year from Haber to a new Florida East Coast Broadcasting Company, owned by General Teleradio executive Harry Trenner and WFEC general manager Herbert Schorr, for $70,000. Two years later, a new group of stockholders, known as Fraternity Associates, bought a third of WFEC in exchange for a $135,000 loan. In 1960, WFEC was sold to Consolidated Communications of Philadelphia for $250,000, with the new owners pledging to retain the station's format.

The WMBM call letters became available when 790 AM changed its call letters to WFUN in January 1961 and became a general-market Top 40 outlet. WFEC took on the WMBM call letters as well as several personalities that had previously broadcast on WMBM at 790. However, WMBM also sought what had already been denied twice to the 1220 facility: the ability to broadcast at night. At the end of 1961, it began negotiating a deal with Latin Broadcasting Company, the owners of WMET (1490 AM), which would see WMET and WMBM swap facilities. The deal was finalized and announced in March 1962; Consolidated paid $253,000 to acquire the WMET-AM-FM facility.

=== WMET and WOAH ===
On April 3, 1962, the WMBM intellectual unit moved to 1490 kHz, and 1220 received a relocated WMET, a Spanish-language outlet. Three years later, however, the station dropped Spanish-language programming and changed its call letters to WOAH, airing Miami's first full-time country music format; the format flip left WFAB as the city's only Spanish-language radio station. Another attempt was made in 1965 to change the station's frequency; however, the FCC dismissed Latin's application to shift to 1190 kHz in 1969.

=== WLTO and WCMQ ===
On January 9, 1969, WOAH changed its call letters to WLTO, returning to Spanish-language programming. However, the station would not experience major turbulence until 1972, when its ownership consortium, Dynamic Broadcasting, sold the outlet to Herbert S. Dolgoff for $450,000. Dolgoff changed the call letters to WCMQ and instituted a Spanish-language pop music format; he did not speak any Spanish when he bought the station but said he was trying to learn.

The new WCMQ call letters connected the station to a lengthy broadcasting heritage in Cuba, where CMQ had been one of the most important broadcasters in the country prior to the Cuban Revolution, when the radio station became the core of the Radio Rebelde national network. A month after they were adopted by the Miami radio station, CMQ Corporation, a production company owned by the Mestre brothers who had owned CMQ before its nationalization, objected to the new moniker, claiming that WCMQ was attempting to traffic in the former Cuban broadcaster's goodwill and reputation. The FCC Broadcast Bureau overrode the objection, but on appeal, the full commission granted CMQ's application for review on February 21, 1973, citing the potential for confusion between the American and Cuban outlets and ordered the radio station to revert to its previous WLTO call letters. The Miami station countered by noting that the Cuban station had not used the call letters on air since 1968. On July 31, 1974, WLTO became WCMQ again; the next year, the FCC denied a petition by CMQ Corporation to deny the license renewal of WCMQ.

As WCMQ, the station upgraded from 250 watts of daytime power to 1,000 in 1978. It also gained an FM partner in 1974 when Dolgoff acquired WQXK-FM in Hialeah and relaunched it as WCMQ-FM.

Dolgoff attempted to sell WCMQ-AM-FM in 1979 to American Radio and Television, owned by Michael F. Leone and Joy S. Davis, for $4.5 million; the sale collapsed in July 1980. By 1981, WCMQ AM aired an Oro Puro ("Pure Gold") oldies format, complementing the younger sound of WCMQ-FM. In the early 1980s WCMQ made its fourth—and successful—attempt to change frequencies and broadcast at night. In 1981, the station filed to change its city of license from Miami to Miami Springs, move from 1220 to 1210 kHz, increase its daytime power and add nighttime service. The station moved to 1210 in 1985 and began transmitting in C-QUAM AM stereo, the first such station in South Florida.

After having owned WCMQ-AM-FM since 1972 and 1974, respectively, Dolgoff sold the pair for $15 million to Spanish Broadcasting System in 1986, marking his retirement from station ownership. SBS ownership brought an overhaul to the AM, which was sinking in the ratings, and changed its moniker from "Radio Alegre" to "Radio Centro" with a faster-paced format.

In the 1990s, WCMQ's programming shifted to talk. The station was the charter Spanish-language broadcaster of the expansion Florida Marlins Major League Baseball team in 1993, with Felo Ramírez as play-by-play announcer, under a deal that included affiliates in Latin America. Tomás García Fusté, a market veteran, defected from competitor WQBA in 1993 after more than a decade at that station.

=== Expanded Band assignment ===
On March 17, 1997, the FCC announced that 88 stations been given permission to move to newly available "Expanded Band" transmitting frequencies, ranging from 1610 to 1700 kHz, with WCMQ authorized to move from 1210 to 1700 kHz.

The call sign for the original WCMQ on 1210 AM was changed to WNMA on November 25, 1997, thus allowing a construction permit for the expanded band station on 1700 AM to inherit the historic WCMQ call letters on December 5, 1997. The FCC's initial policy was that both the original station and its expanded band counterpart could operate simultaneously for up to five years, after which owners would have to turn in one of the two licenses, depending on whether they preferred the new assignment or elected to remain on the original frequency. Due to this requirement, on February 23, 2006, the station on 1700 AM, now with the call letters WJCC, was deleted. However, numerous other joint standard/expanded band station pairs had been permitted to operate beyond the initial five year deadline, and a petition to resume operations was granted, with WJCC's license restored on October 4, 2012. Since then, the FCC deadline has been extended multiple times, and both stations have remained authorized. One restriction is that the FCC has generally required paired original and expanded band stations to remain under common ownership.

=== One-on-One Sports and Radio Única ===
In 1997, citing a desire to exit AM radio and focus on music-formatted FM stations, SBS sold its three AM outlets—WCMQ, KXMG in Los Angeles and WXLX in New York City—to the One-on-One Sports radio network, in a $45 million transaction that saw One-on-One enter station ownership for the first time. For WCMQ listeners and air staff, the move was a shock. García Fusté found out from the Associated Press news wire, and his WCMQ program Micrófono Abierto was flooded with calls. However, for WCMQ, it ended up not being goodbye, as the station moved to a new expanded band license at 1700 kHz. That station signed on November 17, 1997—the same day that 1210 kHz flipped to One-on-One as WNMA.

One-on-One sold WNMA and WCMQ in February 1998 to the Radio Única Spanish-language radio network in a $9 million transaction. WNMA was one of 13 owned-and-operated Radio Única stations, and network operations also were based in Miami. García Fusté continued to host a program. Additionally, WNMA became the Spanish-language home of Miami Dolphins football under a two-year deal in 2001.

=== Sale to Multicultural ===
In 2003, Radio Única declared bankruptcy and sold its 15 stations to Multicultural Broadcasting for $150 million. As part of the bankruptcy, the company laid off 220 employees, including 76 in Miami.

As with most other Multicultural stations, WNMA featured brokered programming. In 2006, Venezuelan radio network Circuito Unión Radio began buying air time to broadcast some of its programming in Miami, hoping to build an audience and fearful of potential reprisals as Hugo Chávez consolidated media power in Venezuela.

In 2011, Deportes Media took over WNMA under a local marketing agreement and ran the ESPN Deportes Spanish-language sports network on the station; WNMA replaced WOCN and increased the signal coverage of the network in south Florida. However, Deportes Media collapsed in 2016, losing its various local marketing agreements in Miami and other cities, and WMYM (990 AM) replaced it in the network.

After ESPN Deportes moved to WMYM, WNMA returned to talk, airing programming in English and Spanish.

=== 1210 The Man ===
In late 2018, Cielo Media, led by former Salem Media Group Miami general manager, Tony Catalyud, began leasing WNMA. It relaunched the station as a male-oriented talk outlet, "1210 The Man", in March 2019. The station added a series of Caribbean talk shows to its Saturday lineup in September; the programs, which debuted in the 1980s, had aired over WZAB (880 AM) before it was sold to Immaculate Heart Media and became part of the Relevant Radio network.

=== Oasis ===
In June 2021, Adrian Pontes leased the station and relaunched it with Spanish-language Christian programming as "Radio Oasis 1210". One of the programs on the station will be his afternoon show, which had previously aired on WEYS-LP 87.7.

=== Spanish and English classic hits ===
In June 2023, The Spanish Christian "Radio Oasis" format moved to WMYM and WNMA has since been airing a Spanish and English classic hits format.

=== Radio Mundo ===
On November 30, 2023, WNMA flipped to Spanish talk as "Radio Mundo 1210".
