= 1650 AM =

AM radio frequency

The following radio stations broadcast on AM frequency 1650 kHz: 1650 AM is a Regional broadcast frequency.

== Argentina ==
- LRI 227 in Pilar, Buenos Aires

== Canada ==
Call sign	City of license	Daytime power (kW)	Nighttime power (kW)	Transmitter coordinates
CINA	Mississauga, Ontario	5	0.68	43.625556°N 79.631111°W
CKZW	Montreal, Quebec	1	1	45.4875°N 73.6686°W

== United States ==
All stations are Class B stations.

Call sign	City of license	Facility ID	Daytime power (kW)	Nighttime power (kW)	Transmitter coordinates
KBJD	Denver, Colorado	87151	10	1	39.798889°N 104.97°W
KCNZ	Cedar Falls, Iowa	87158	10	1	42.413056°N 92.4375°W
KFOX	Torrance, California	87242	10	0.49	34.019444°N 118.344722°W
KFSW	Ft. Smith, Arkansas	87114	10	1	35.274722°N 94.459722°W
KSVE	El Paso, Texas	87165	8.5	0.85	31.753611°N 106.416111°W
WJFV	Portsmouth, Virginia	87170	10	1	36.802778°N 76.282778°W

== See also ==
- AM expanded band
- List of AM Expanded Band station assignments issued by the Federal Communications Commission on March 17, 1997
