= 1630 AM =

AM radio frequency

The following radio stations broadcast on AM frequency 1630 kHz: 1630 AM is a Regional broadcast frequency.

== Argentina ==
- LRM991 AMérica in San José
- Restauración in Hurlingham, Buenos Aires.

== Mexico ==
- XESCAH-AM in Tarímbaro, Michoacán de Ocampo
- XEUT-AM in Tijuana, Baja California

== United States ==
All stations operate with 10 kW during the daytime and 1 kW at nighttime and are Class B stations.

Call sign	City of license	Facility ID	Transmitter coordinates
KCJJ	Iowa City, Iowa	87115	41.600833°N 91.501111°W
KFBU	Fox Farm, Wyoming	87155	41.122778°N 105.801944°W
KKGM	Fort Worth, Texas	87147	32.809722°N 97.123333°W

== See also ==
- AM expanded band
- List of AM Expanded Band station assignments issued by the Federal Communications Commission on March 17, 1997
