= KLFE =

Coordinates: 47°39′19″N 122°31′06″W

- Seattle, Washington; United States
- Broadcast area: Seattle metropolitan area
- Frequency: 1590 kHz
- Branding: Relevant Radio

Programming
- Format: Catholic radio
- Affiliations: Relevant Radio

Ownership
- Owner: Relevant Radio; (Relevant Radio, Inc.)

History
- First air date: September 10, 1956
- Former call signs: KTIX (1955–1962); KETO (1962–1968); KSND (1968–1970); KUUU (1970–1977); KZOK (1977-1982, 1989-1994); KJET (1982–1988); KQUL (1988–1989); KPOZ (1994–1995)
- Call sign meaning: "Life"

Technical information
- Licensing authority: FCC
- Facility ID: 12031
- Class: B
- Power: 20,000 watts day; 5,000 watts night

Links
- Public license information: Public file; LMS
- Webcast: Listen Live
- Website: relevantradio.com

KLFE (1590 AM) is a radio station broadcasting a Catholic radio format in Seattle, Washington. The station is owned by Relevant Radio and airs programming from Relevant Radio, a national Catholic network based in Green Bay, Wisconsin. The radio studios and offices are on 5th Avenue South in Seattle.

By day, KLFE transmits 20,000 watts; to protect other stations on 1590 AM at night, it reduces power to 5,000 watts. It uses a directional antenna with a two-tower array. The transmitter is on North Madison Avenue on Bainbridge Island.

== History ==
=== KTIX, KETO and KUUU ===
The station first signed on the air on September 10, 1956. The original call sign was KTIX. It had a full-service format. For the first two years, the station was a daytimer, going off the air at sunset. It upgraded to full-time status in 1958. KTIX was owned by Gordon Allen, who sold the station to broker Hugh Ben LaRue.

In 1962, William Boeing bought the station, flipped it to a country music format and took the call letters KETO. The station also launched an FM counterpart on 101.5 (now KPLZ-FM). Boeing sold the station to Weaver-Davis Broadcasting. The station then shifted to Adult Contemporary as KSND. In 1970, the call sign changed to KUUU, and rebranded as "KU16". At the time, a daytime transmitter in South Seattle and a nighttime transmitter on Bainbridge Island was needed so KUUU would not interfere with co-channel KTIL in Netarts, Oregon. Sterling Recreation Organization bought KUUU and became a sister station with KZOK-FM in 1975, with the call letters changing to KZOK in 1977. It flipped to an Oldies format as "Solid Gold 16 KZOK".

=== Modern Rock KJET ===
At midnight on May 31, 1982, 1590 became KJET with a Modern Rock format, which was starting to emerge in popularity at the time. The first song on "KJET" was "I Love Rock & Roll" by Joan Jett & the Blackhearts.

The station gained immediate popularity with its primary target audience of young adults, as the market did not have an alternative station on FM radio, which was where most music formats were migrating. In addition, the station also had a following outside of Seattle, particularly at night, due to its signal strength, where it was receivable in Eastern Washington and as far north as Alaska. However, due to financial troubles, KJET signed off at 3 p.m. on September 23, 1988, with "Through Being Cool" by Devo as the final song.

=== KQUL and KZOK ===
After KJET signed off, the station became KQUL, with a 1950s/60s oldies format, and was completely satellite-fed from the "Kool Gold" network. Adams Communications bought the station in 1989, with Chrysler Capital Corporation buying the station in December 1992 due to Adams' bankruptcy.

KQUL changed its call letters back to KZOK in November 1989, and on February 1, 1990, became Seattle's home for the Z-Rock network, which specialized in active rock and heavy metal music. It later changed to a simulcast of KZOK-FM in October 1993.

=== Salem Radio ===
On September 8, 1994, after Chrysler Capital sold the station to Salem Communications, KZOK became KPOZ with a "positive Country" format. Under Salem, it later transitioned to Christian music.

On August 1, 1995, the station's call sign switched to KLFE. The call letters represent the word "Life."

=== Expanded Band assignment ===
On March 17, 1997, the Federal Communications Commission (FCC) announced that eighty-eight stations had been given permission to move to newly available "Expanded Band" transmitting frequencies, ranging from 1610 to 1700 kHz, with KLFE authorized to move from 1590 to 1680 kHz.

A Construction Permit for the expanded band station was assigned the call letters KAZJ (now KNTS) on January 9, 1998. The FCC's initial policy was that both the original station and its expanded band counterpart could operate simultaneously for up to five years, after which owners would have to turn in one of the two licenses, depending on whether they preferred the new assignment or elected to remain on the original frequency. However, this deadline has been extended multiple times, and both stations have remained authorized.

=== Conservative talk ===
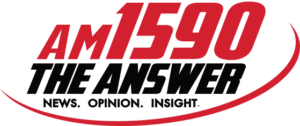
Former logo as AM 1590 The Answer

By 2000, brokered Russian programming was added to the station's schedule. On November 15, 2010, KLFE switched to a conservative talk format, featuring hosts such as Bill Bennett, Mike Gallagher, Dennis Prager, Dennis Miller, Hugh Hewitt, and Mark Levin. Salem's own Michael Medved, based in Seattle, was not heard on the station due to his existing contract with KTTH. In August 2014, Salem Radio announced a name change to "AM 1590 The Answer", following suit with most of the other conservative talk radio stations operated by Salem nationwide.

On August 1, 2022, KLFE's format and the "Answer" branding were moved to co-owned KKOL. KLFE switched to Catholic radio programming from Relevant Radio, a network based in Green Bay, Wisconsin, and Inspiration Media also filed an application to sell KLFE to Relevant Radio. The FCC has generally required paired original and expanded band stations to remain under common ownership. However, Inspiration Media also filed a waiver request with the FCC to allow it to sell KLFE's companion expanded band station on AM 1680, KNTS, to a different company, Baaz Broadcasting.
