= 1690 AM =

AM radio frequency

1690 AM is a Regional broadcast frequency. The following radio stations broadcast on AM frequency 1690 kHz:

== Argentina ==
- Cristo La Solución in San Justo

== Canada ==
Call sign	City of license	Day kW	Night kW	Transmitter coordinates
CHTO	Toronto, Ontario	6	1	43.7128°N 79.3156°W
CJLO	Montreal, Quebec	1	1	45.4478°N 73.6578°W

== United States ==
All stations are Class B stations.

Call sign	City of license	Facility ID	Daytime power (kW)	Nighttime power (kW)	Transmitter coordinates
KDMT	Arvada, Colorado	86619	10	1	39.655833°N 105.074167°W
KFSG	Roseville, California	87177	10	1	38.747778°N 121.4925°W
WIGT	Charlotte Amalie, United States Virgin Islands	87157	0.92	0.92	18.315833°N 64.883889°W
WMLB	Avondale Estates, Georgia	87118	10	1	33.809444°N 84.353889°W
WPTX	Lexington Park, Maryland	87109	10	1	38.282778°N 76.560833°W
WVON	Berwyn, Illinois	87178	10	1	41.737222°N 87.701111°W

== See also ==
- AM expanded band
- List of AM Expanded Band station assignments issued by the Federal Communications Commission on March 17, 1997
