= WSYD =

- Mount Airy, North Carolina; United States
- Broadcast area: Surry County, North Carolina
- Frequency: 1300 kHz
- Branding: Granite City Gold

Programming
- Format: Oldies

Ownership
- Owner: Granite City Broadcasting

History
- First air date: 1951

Technical information
- Licensing authority: FCC
- Facility ID: 64066
- Class: B
- Power: 5,000 watts day 1,000 watts night
- Transmitter coordinates: 36°30′12.00″N 80°35′35.00″W
- Translator: 105.1 W286DM (Mount Airy)

Links
- Public license information: Public file; LMS
- Webcast: Listen Live
- Website: wsyd1300.com

WSYD (1300 AM) is a radio station broadcasting an oldies format. Licensed to Mount Airy, North Carolina, United States, the station serves Surry County, North Carolina. The station is currently owned by Granite City Broadcasting and features programming from Salem Communications.

== History ==
WSYD started out playing rock and roll in the mid-1950s. Prior to the most recent change, the station played a mix of contemporary and classic country.

=== Expanded Band assignment ===
On March 17, 1997 the Federal Communications Commission (FCC) announced that 88 stations had been given permission to move to newly available "Expanded Band" transmitting frequencies, ranging from 1610 to 1700 kHz, with WSYD authorized to move from 1300 to 1640 kHz. A Construction Permit for the expanded band station, also in Mount Airy, was assigned the callsign WLHJ on November 10, 1997. However the expanded band station was never built, and its Construction Permit was cancelled on December 22, 2000.

=== Later history ===
A switch to oldies took place on April 6, 2011, after news director Mark Brown asked listeners what music they would like to hear. A poll was conducted, and the listeners voted overwhelmingly for the switch to a "pop oldies" format, dubbed "Granite City Gold."
