= KPYN =

Coordinates: 33°04′58″N 94°10′58″W

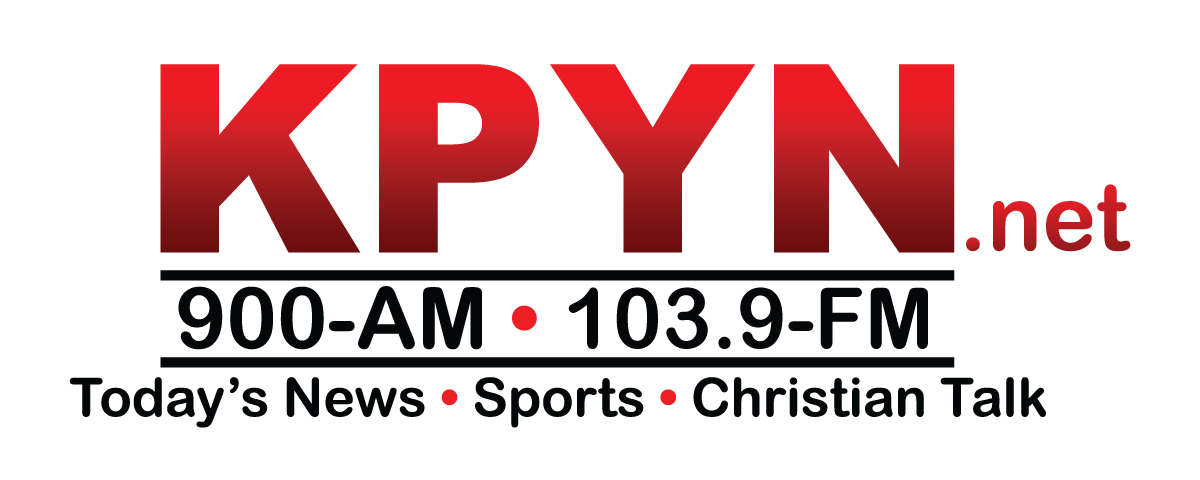
- Atlanta, Texas; United States
- Frequency: 900 kHz
- Branding: KPYN 900 AM - 103.9 FM

Programming
- Format: Talk radio

Ownership
- Owner: Freed AM Corp.

History
- First air date: 1950
- Former call signs: KALT (1950–2000)

Technical information
- Licensing authority: FCC
- Facility ID: 2766
- Class: D
- Power: 1,000 watts (day); 33 watts (night)
- Translator: 103.9 K280GV (Atlanta)

Links
- Public license information: Public file; LMS
- Webcast: Listen live
- Website: kpyn.net

KPYN is a radio station airing a talk radio format licensed to Atlanta, Texas, broadcasting on 900 AM. The station is owned by Freed AM Corp.

KPYN is also heard on 95.5 FM and 103.9 FM through translators located in Atlanta, Texas.

== History ==
The station was first licensed in 1950, as KALT, to the Ark-La-Tex Broadcasting Company, operating with 1,000 watts on 900 kHz, daytime only.

=== Expanded Band assignment ===
On March 17, 1997, the Federal Communications Commission (FCC) announced that 88 stations had been given permission to move to newly available "Expanded Band" transmitting frequencies, from 1610 to 1700 kHz. KALT was the only station in the United States authorized for 1610 kHz. This new assignment inherited the KALT call sign, with the original KALT changing to KPYN on June 30, 2000.

The FCC provided that both the original station and its expanded band counterpart could optionally operate simultaneously for up to five years, after which owners would have to turn in one of the two licenses, depending on whether they preferred the new assignment or elected to remain on the original frequency. It was ultimately decided to relinquish the 1610 kHz assignment, which was deleted on July 18, 2005, and continue broadcasting on the original 900 kHz frequency.
