= KNTS (AM) =

Radio station in Seattle

Simulcast of KKDZ Seattle
- Seattle, Washington; United States
- Broadcast area: Seattle metropolitan area
- Frequency: 1680 kHz
- Branding: Radio Punjab

Programming
- Language: Punjabi
- Format: South Asian music and talk

Ownership
- Owner: Baaz Broadcasting Corp.

History
- First air date: 1998; 28 years ago
- Former call signs: KAZJ (1998–2001); KTFH (2001–2006); KDOW (2006–2008)

Technical information
- Licensing authority: FCC
- Facility ID: 87153
- Class: B
- Power: 10,000 watts (day); 1,000 watts (night)
- Transmitter coordinates: 47°39′20″N 122°31′5″W

Links
- Public license information: Public file; LMS
- Website: radiopunjab.com

KNTS (1680 kHz) is a commercial AM radio station licensed to Seattle, Washington. Along with sister station KKDZ 1250 AM, it simulcasts a format of South Asian music and talk from the Radio Punjab network. It is owned by the Baaz Broadcasting Corporation, with offices on 104th Avenue SE in Kent.

KNTS is an expanded band Class B AM station. By day, it is powered at 10,000 watts non-directional. But at night, to protect other stations on 1680 AM from interference, it reduces power to 1,000 watts. The transmitter is on North Madison Avenue NE on Bainbridge Island.

== History ==
KNTS originated as the expanded band "twin" of an existing station on the standard AM band. On March 17, 1997, the Federal Communications Commission (FCC) announced that 88 stations had been given permission to move to newly available "Expanded Band" transmitting frequencies, ranging from 1610 to 1700 kHz, with KLFE in Seattle authorized to move from 1590 to 1680 kHz.

A construction permit for the expanded band station was assigned the call sign KAZJ on January 9, 1998. The FCC's initial policy was that both the original station and its expanded band counterpart could operate simultaneously for up to five years, after which owners would have to turn in one of the two licenses, depending on whether they preferred the new assignment or elected to remain on the original frequency. However, this deadline has been extended multiple times, and both stations have remained authorized.

The station’s call letters were changed to KTFH on July 22, 2001, to KDOW on June 16, 2006, and to KNTS on July 1, 2008.

On February 11, 2021, KNTS flipped to Regional Mexican music as "La Patrona 1680".

On August 5, 2022, Salem Media, the owner, announced it would sell the station to Baaz Broadcasting. The FCC has generally required paired original and expanded band stations to remain under common ownership. However, Salem Media proposed selling KNTS's standard band companion, KLFE on AM 1590, to a different company, Relevant Radio and a waiver request was filed with the FCC to allow an exception to the common ownership requirement. This listed as one justification that a waiver would support FCC efforts to increase minority radio stations holdings, as Baaz "was 100% controlled by individuals of South Asian descent". In addition, the $225,000 sales price was said to be less than half of KNTS's fair market value, as established by independent appraisal.

On March 1, 2023, KNTS dropped the Regional Mexican format and began simulcasting sister station 1300 KKOL, which airs the Salem Radio Network's conservative talk programming. That only lasted a few months. When the sale was completed, AM 1680 joined the Radio Punjab network of radio stations broadcasting South Asian music and talk.

In March 2026, KNTS went silent after the FCC granted them an STA to resolve issues.
