= Reference distance =

Radio license certification

In broadcast engineering, the reference distance is the distance at which a radio station signal is predicted to reach a service contour under standard propagation conditions. For FM broadcasting, this typically corresponds to the 1 mV/m (60 dBµ) contour under average terrain and normal atmospheric conditions.

This reference distance primarily depends on the station’s effective radiated power (ERP) and height above average terrain (HAAT), with adjustments applied according to Federal Communications Commission (FCC) propagation charts ensuring that the station does not exceed licensed limits.

The actual distance a station's signal travels depends highly on weather: factors like temperature inversions and heavy precipitation have a strong and highly variable influence on radio propagation. However, for purposes of broadcast law such as construction permits and broadcast licenses, fixed calculations called propagation curves are applied to determine the reference distances for all existing and proposed stations. These also take into account beam tilt, carrier frequency, and even the Earth's curvature at longer distances.

The reference distance is in turn used to define most broadcast classes for FM stations in North America. Each class (except D) is defined as having a maximum ERP and HAAT. If the HAAT of a station's radio antenna exceeds that specified for the class, it must reduce ERP so that its signal does not exceed the reference distance. The signal strength used differs by class, but generally the value is 1.0 mV/m (millivolt per meter) or 60 dBu (decibels over one microvolt per meter) for most of the United States, and 0.5 mV/m or 54 dBu in Canada, and for some U.S. stations in parts of certain areas including California, the Great Lakes region, and the Northeast. This is considered the service contour of a station by the Federal Communications Commission (FCC) and the Canadian Radio-television and Telecommunications Commission (CRTC), and by Telecommunications Regulatory Commission (CRT) in Mexico, according to NARBA and other international agreements among the three. The reference distances are in turn used to create mandatory minimum spacing distances among co-channel stations, and certain adjacent channels as well.

Real-world calculations can also be done by including data from digital topographical maps, typically along 12 or 16 radials, and including the specifications from the radiation pattern for a directional antenna. However, this does not fit the definition of a reference in this sense, even though it determines the actual broadcast range of a station. This actual range is used in the reserved band in the U.S., while the reference distance is used for commercial radio stations.
