= 1640 AM =

AM radio frequency

The following radio stations broadcast on AM frequency 1640 kHz: 1640 AM is a Regional broadcast frequency.

== Argentina ==
- Hosanna in Isidro Casanova

== México ==
- XECSIB-AM in Zamora, Michoacán

== United States ==
All stations operate with 10 kW during the daytime and are Class B stations.

Call sign	City of license	Facility	Nighttime power (kW)	Transmitter coordinates
KBJA	Sandy, Utah	87119	1	40.713056°N 111.931389°W
KDIA	Vallejo, California	87108	10	37.895556°N 122.324167°W (daytime); 38.134167°N 122.425556°W (nighttime)
KPAM	Lake Oswego, Oregon	86618	1	45.453889°N 122.546389°W
KZLS	Enid, Oklahoma	87168	1	36.115278°N 97.756389°W
WSJP	Sussex, Wisconsin	87121	1	43.077222°N 88.192222°W

== See also ==
- AM expanded band
- List of AM Expanded Band station assignments issued by the Federal Communications Commission on March 17, 1997
