= KMPC =

Korean–language radio station in Los Angeles

- Los Angeles, California; United States
- Broadcast area: Greater Los Angeles
- Frequency: 1540 kHz
- Branding: Radio Korea

Programming
- Format: Korean programming

Ownership
- Owner: P&Y Broadcasting Corporation

History
- First air date: September 22, 1952
- Former call signs: KPOL (1952–1979); KZLA (1979–1984); KSKQ (1984–1992); KXED (1992–1996); KXMG (1996–1997); KCTD (1997–2000)
- Call sign meaning: Multilingual Programming Corporation

Technical information
- Licensing authority: FCC
- Facility ID: 61647
- Class: B
- Power: 50,000 watts (day); 37,000 watts (night)
- Transmitter coordinates: 34°4′43″N 118°11′8.3″W

Links
- Public license information: Public file; LMS
- Webcast: Listen live
- Website: radiokorea.com

KMPC (1540 AM, "Radio Korea", 라디오코리아) is a commercial radio station licensed to Los Angeles, California, United States. It is owned by P&Y Broadcasting Corporation. Radio Korea is a division of the Radio Korea Media Group. The station airs Korean language programming, a blend of talk, news, information, and music for the largest Korean American community in the United States, and the largest Korean community outside Korea. KMPC is one of four radio stations in the region that broadcast entirely in Korean, the others are KGBN in Anaheim, KYPA in Los Angeles and KFOX in Torrance.

KMPC's offices are in La Palma in Orange County. KMPC's transmitter is sited off of Carter Drive in the El Sereno district of Los Angeles.

== History ==
=== KPOL ===
On September 22, 1952, the station signed on with the call sign KPOL. It ran 5,000 watts and was originally a daytimer, required to be off the air at sunset. It was owned by Coast Radio Broadcasting Corporation. In 1958, it added an FM station at 93.9 MHz, KPOL-FM (now KLLI). Then in 1965, it put a television station on the air, KPOL-TV (channel 22, now KSCN-TV).

KPOL 1540 went on the air 10 minutes after receiving Federal Communications Commission (FCC) approval. The following year, its power was increased to 10,000 watts. Full time operations were added in 1958, with a power of 10,000 watts at night using a directional antenna array. Daytime power was increased to 50,000 watts in 1961.

In its early years, KPOL aired several polka music programs. That gave the station its call letters. Tom Kennedy, later a popular TV game show host, was a polka DJ on the station during this era.

In 1959, KPOL advertised on a billboard at Los Angeles's Wrigley Field, which can be seen in the television series Home Run Derby.

In 1966, KPOL-AM-FM were sold to Capital Cities Broadcasting for $7.8 million.

For many years, KPOL aired an easy listening/beautiful music format on both AM and FM. In the late 1970s, the station switched to a soft adult contemporary format. In August 1978, it began carrying the syndicated Larry King Show overnight.

=== KZLA ===
In 1979, the station's call sign was changed to KZLA while airing a more upbeat adult contemporary format, simulcast with 93.9 KZLA-FM. But with several other AC stations in Los Angeles, KZLA-AM-FM had trouble achieving significant ratings.

In 1980, with no country music station on FM in Los Angeles, KZLA-AM-FM flipped to a country format.

As of 2006, the KZLA calls are assigned to a Rhythmic Oldies station serving Fresno, California.

=== Spanish language era ===
In 1984, the station was sold to Spanish Broadcasting System for $5 million. In December 1984, the station's call sign was changed to KSKQ, and it adopted a Spanish language format as "La Super KQ". (KSKQ is now a non-commercial educational station in Ashland, Oregon.)

On August 4, 1992, its call sign was changed to KXED, and it aired a Mexican pop/contemporary format branded "La Grande" or The Big One. On March 29, 1996, the station's call sign was changed to KXMG. In late 1996, its format was changed from Regional Mexican to Spanish oldies.

=== Sports era ===
In 1997, One on One Sports Inc. of Northbrook, Illinois, purchased the station and changed its format to sports, as an owned-and-operated network affiliate of One-on-One Sports, later known as Sporting News Radio, a nationally syndicated 24/7 sports network. On December 19, 1997, its call sign was changed to KCTD. One on One Sports also bought AM stations in the New York City and Chicago areas, so it would have its programming available in the largest, second largest and third largest radio markets.

On March 28, 2000, the call sign was changed to KMPC. In 2000, One-on-One Sports was acquired by Paul Allen's Vulcan Ventures, and ownership of KMPC was transferred to Paul Allen's Rose City Radio Corporation. The KMPC call letters had long been used in Los Angeles on AM 710 (now KSPN). On February 10, 2003, the station began to be branded "1540 The Ticket", concurrent with the launch of a new local morning show, hosted by Roger Lodge.

The station covered Southern California sports teams, including the San Diego Chargers. It also aired select Westwood One sports programming not carried by CBS Radio's KFWB and KLSX. Among the many Westwood One games KMPC carried include NCAA basketball, PGA Tour golf tournament updates (mostly those covered by CBS Sports television), the Masters Tournament and NFL football (including Monday Night Football on occasion).

In 2006, KMPC lost the broadcast rights to University of Southern California Trojans basketball and football to rival 710 KSPN. KMPC acquired the local broadcast rights of the University of Notre Dame's football games from Westwood One. The station also stopped covering NASCAR races after having done so for several years.

The station's regular talk-show hosts included Tony Bruno, who began his morning show in April 2005 following the departure of Roger Lodge; Dave Smith, Fred Roggin, and former USC football player Petros Papadakis.

Former Los Angeles Dodgers broadcaster Ross Porter filled in for Roggin in May 2005.

Roger Nadel, former GM of all-news KFWB in Los Angeles, was General Manager.

In June 2006, former afternoon host and KNBC-TV sports director Fred Roggin left KMPC, resulting in a shift in the station's daily programming lineup and the addition of a new program, the Atlanta-based 2 Live Stews.

On September 5, 2006, it was announced that Sporting News Radio would be sold to American City Business Journals for an undisclosed price. In October 2006, the station fired all local on-air staff.

=== Radio Korea ===
In 2007, the station was sold to P&Y Broadcasting for $33 million, and it began to air Korean language programming as "Radio Korea". In April 2013, KMPC began airing Korean language broadcasts of Los Angeles Dodgers baseball games.

In December 2025, the station moved its offices to La Palma. This caused controversy in the Los Angeles area Korean community.
