= KFSW =

Currently silent
- Fort Smith, Arkansas; United States
- Broadcast area: Fort Smith, Arkansas
- Frequency: 1650 kHz
- Branding: The Cross 98.7

Programming
- Format: Southern gospel

Ownership
- Owner: M&M Media, LLC

History
- First air date: 2001
- Former call signs: KHFS (1997–2000); KWHN (2000–2008); KYHN (2008–2015)

Technical information
- Licensing authority: FCC
- Facility ID: 87114
- Class: B
- Power: 10,000 watts (day); 1,000 watts (night)
- Transmitter coordinates: 35°16′29″N 94°27′36″W
- Translator: 98.7 K254AM (Fort Smith)

Links
- Public license information: Public file; LMS
- Webcast: Listen live
- Website: thecross987.com

KFSW (1650 AM) is a currently silent radio station that broadcast a southern gospel format to the Fort Smith, Arkansas, United States, area. The station is licensed to M&M Media, LLC.

KFSW's signal has one of the largest coverage areas for a Fort Smith AM station, while the broadcast radius from FM translator K254AM (98.7 MHz) reaches as far away from Fort Smith as Spiro and Muldrow, Oklahoma, as well as Greenwood and Van Buren, Arkansas.

== History ==
KFSW began as the expanded band twin to an existing station on the standard AM band. On March 17, 1997, the Federal Communications Commission (FCC) announced that 88 stations had been given permission to move to newly available "Expanded Band" transmitting frequencies, ranging from 1610 to 1700 kHz. In Fort Smith, Arkansas, KWHN was authorized to move from 1320 to 1650 kHz.

On November 10, 1997, the new station on 1650 AM was assigned the call sign KHFS. The FCC's initial policy was that both the original station and its expanded band counterpart could operate simultaneously for up to five years, after which owners would have to turn in one of the two licenses, depending on whether they preferred the new assignment or elected to remain on the original frequency. However, this deadline has been extended multiple times, and both stations have remained authorized.

In 2000, the stations were acquired by Clear Channel Communications. On November 22, 2000, the call sign KWHN was transferred from 1320 AM to 1650 AM, while 1320 AM changed its call sign to KYHN. At this time, 1650 AM was simulcasting the 1320 AM programming.

In the spring of 2008, after extensive rain and flooding in western Arkansas, the transmitter site for 1650 AM suffered heavy water damage, and on April 2, 2008, the station filed a 'Notification of Suspension of Operations/Request for Silent STA' with the FCC, stating:

Due to heavy spring rains, localized flooding of a nearby waterway placed the transmitter site, and the transmitter itself under several feet of water. Access to the site to determine damage has only recently been allowed, and a casual inspection has revealed tremendous amounts of damage. In order to be allowed time to decide how to best proceeded (sic) with this facility, the licensee requests Special Temporary Authority to remain silent for up to 1 year.

The next day a call sign swap was made, with KWHN moving back to 1320 AM from 1650 AM, and KYHN transferred from 1320 AM to 1650 AM.

In 2010 Capstar TX LLC proposed including the silent KYHN to be one of four stations to be transferred to MMTC (Minority Media and Telecommunications Council) Broadcasting LLC. However, this was in conflict with the FCC's general policy that original AM band stations and their expanded band counterparts had to remain under common ownership. An exception to this policy was approved, on the grounds that "Capstar's donation of the facility to MMTC, which planned to use KYHN to train women and minority group members in broadcasting and broadcast management, advanced the diversity goals set forth in the pending proceeding Promoting Diversification of Ownership in the Broadcasting Services". Since then, the stations on 1320 AM and 1650 AM have had different owners.

MMTC later reported that KYHN had again gone silent on February 18, 2012, "for financial reasons". That same year the station was sold to Ms. Kim Media LLC (Kim Girdner) for $50,000, who in turn transferred the license the next year to G2 Media Group LLC, owned by her husband, Darren F. Girdner, for "assumption of liabilities".

On October 2, 2015, the station’s call sign was changed from KYHN to KFSW. The station added FM translator K254AM (98.7 MHz) as a repeater in November 2015. On January 1, 2020, the format was changed from contemporary Christian to southern gospel, branded as "The Cross 98.7". KFSW again went silent in November 2025, as M&M Media evaluated whether it would modify the station's facilities or sell it.
