= 1610 AM =

AM radio frequency

The following radio stations broadcast on AM frequency 1610 kHz.

AM 1610 is currently exclusively used in the United States by low-power travelers' information stations. The frequency is sparsely used elsewhere in North America, where it is classified as a "regional" frequency. Only stations in Canada's two largest cities use the frequency, and one Mexican station has been authorized for its use.

== Canada ==
Call sign	City of license	Day kW	Night kW	Transmitter coordinates
CHHA	Toronto, Ontario	10	10	43.6425°N 79.339444°W
CHRN	Montreal, Quebec	1	1	45.4478°N 73.6583°W

== United States ==
All stations at 1610 in the United States currently operate as Travelers' information stations.

- WNKI578, Idyllwild, California

== See also ==
- AM expanded band
- List of AM Expanded Band station assignments issued by the Federal Communications Commission on March 17, 1997
