= 1660 AM =

AM radio frequency

The following radio stations broadcast on AM frequency 1660 kHz: 1660 AM is a Regional broadcast frequency.

== Argentina ==
- LRI232 in Nogoya, Entre Rios

== United States ==
All stations operate with 10 kW during the daytime and are Class B stations.

Call sign	City of license	Facility ID	Nighttime power (kW)	Transmitter coordinates
KBRE	Merced, California	87180	1	37.278056°N 120.626389°W
KQWB	West Fargo, North Dakota	87146	1	46.975833°N 96.583889°W
KRZI	Waco, Texas	87179	1	31.518333°N 97.088056°W
KWOD	Kansas City, Kansas	87143	1	39.071944°N 94.682778°W
WCNZ	Marco Island, Florida	86909	1	25.991667°N 81.625°W
WGIT	Canovanas, Puerto Rico	87150	1	18.385833°N 65.921111°W
WZOX	Kalamazoo, Michigan	87325	1	42.236389°N 85.576944°W
WWRU	Jersey City, New Jersey	87123	10	40.820278°N 74.067778°W

== See also ==
- AM expanded band
- List of AM Expanded Band station assignments issued by the Federal Communications Commission on March 17, 1997
