= KFOX (AM) =

Korean-language radio station in Torrance, California, United States

- Torrance, California; United States
- Broadcast area: Los Angeles metropolitan area
- Frequency: 1650 kHz
- Branding: Radio Seoul

Programming
- Format: Korean language

Ownership
- Owner: HK Media, Inc.

History
- First air date: December 29, 1997
- Former call signs: KGXL (1998, 1999–2000); KKTR (1998)

Technical information
- Licensing authority: FCC
- Facility ID: 87242
- Class: B
- Power: 10,000 watts (day); 490 watts (night)
- Transmitter coordinates: 34°1′10″N 118°20′44.3″W

Links
- Public license information: Public file; LMS
- Website: radioseoul1650.com

KFOX (1650 AM) is a Korean language radio station licensed to Torrance, California, United States, and serving the Los Angeles metropolitan area. It shares a transmitter site with KWKW and KABC.

KFOX is one of three radio stations in the greater Los Angeles area broadcasting entirely in Korean, in addition to KMPC and KYPA.

== History ==
KFOX began as the "expanded band" twin to a station on the standard AM band. On March 17, 1997, the Federal Communications Commission (FCC) announced that 88 stations had been given permission to move to newly available "Expanded Band" transmitting frequencies, ranging from 1610 to 1700 kHz, with KNOB in Costa Mesa authorized to move from 540 kHz to 1650 kHz.

The FCC's initial policy was that both the original station and its expanded band counterpart could operate simultaneously for up to five years, after which owners would have to turn in one of the two licenses, depending on whether they preferred the new assignment or elected to remain on the original frequency. It was decided to eliminate the standard band station, and on August 15, 2000, the license for the original station on 540 kHz, by then using the call letters KKGO, was cancelled.

The new station on 1650 kHz was assigned the call letters KGXL on December 29, 1997, and originally simulcast sister station KGIL's adult standards format. The call letters were changed to KKTR on June 1, 1998, to match a change in format to "K-Traffic" with constant news updates and eight traffic updates each hour. The calls were switched back to KGXL on March 15, 1999, along with a return to a simulcast with 1260.

On July 26, 2000, after an ownership change, the call sign was changed to KFOX, a call sign previously used by two area stations dating back to 1928: 1280 AM (now KFRN) and 93.5 FM (now KDAY).

In 2001, KFOX switched from broadcasting in English to Korean, and adopted the slogan "Radio Seoul".
