= WCHQ (Puerto Rico) =

Radio station in Camuy, Puerto Rico (1970–2013)

Camuy, Puerto Rico; Puerto Rico
- Frequency: 1360 kHz
- Branding: Super Q 1360

Ownership
- Owner: Aureo A. Matos and Olga Rosario

History
- First air date: December 23, 1970
- Last air date: December 24, 2003
- Call sign meaning: Camuy, Hatillo, Quebradillas

Technical information
- Facility ID: 16417
- Class: B
- Power: 1,000 watts day; 1,000 watts night
- Transmitter coordinates: 18°28′18″N 66°51′42″W

WCHQ (1360 AM, Super Q) was a radio station licensed to serve Camuy, Puerto Rico. The station was owned by Aureo A. Matos (President and General Manager of the station) and Olga Rosario.

== History ==
The station was assigned the WCHQ call letters by the Federal Communications Commission (FCC) on December 23, 1970. The company has had multiple ownership changes. Camuy Broadcasting Corporation sold WCHQ to Del Pueblo Radio Corporation in 1984. At that time, the station was known as "13-Q AM".

=== Expanded Band assignment ===
On March 17, 1997 the FCC announced that eighty-eight stations had been given permission to move to newly available "Expanded Band" transmitting frequencies, ranging from 1610 to 1700 kHz, with WCHQ authorized to move from 1360 to 1660 kHz. A construction permit for the expanded band station was assigned the call letters WGIT on December 14, 2000. WGIT later moved to Canóvanas.

=== Later history ===
On July 25, 2000, Del Pueblo Radio Corporation announced that it would sell WCHQ to Aureo A. Matos. The deal was completed on July 30, 2000.

An FCC policy for expanded band authorizations was that both the original station and its expanded band counterpart could operate simultaneously for up to five years, after which owners would have to turn in one of the two licenses, depending on whether they preferred the new assignment or elected to remain on the original frequency. On December 24, 2003, after 33 years on the air, WCHQ went silent and was forced to shut down. On April 5, 2004, the station's license was cancelled and the call sign deleted from its database by the FCC.
