= WJCC (AM) =

Multicultural radio station in Miami Springs, Florida, United States

Currently silent
- Miami Springs, Florida; United States
- Broadcast area: Miami metropolitan area
- Frequency: 1700 kHz
- Branding: Radio Mega 1700 AM

Programming
- Language: Multilingual
- Format: Haitian Creole talk music and news World Ethnic

Ownership
- Owner: Multicultural Broadcasting; (Multicultural Radio Broadcasting Licensee, LLC)
- Sister stations: WEXY, WNMA

History
- First air date: December 5, 1997 (28 years ago)
- Former call signs: WCMQ (1997–1999); WRNU (1999); WAFN (1999–2001); WJCC (2001–2006) (Station was deleted 2006, relicensed 2012)

Technical information
- Licensing authority: FCC
- Facility ID: 87169
- Class: B
- Power: 10,000 watts day 1,000 watts night
- Transmitter coordinates: 25°54′2″N 80°21′50″W

Links
- Public license information: Public file; LMS
- Webcast: Listen Live
- Website: radiomega.net

WJCC (1700 kHz) is a commercial AM radio station licensed to Miami Springs, Florida, and serving the Miami metropolitan area. It is owned by Multicultural Broadcasting with studios on NW 58rd Street at NW 72nd Avenue in Miami. It broadcasts mostly Haitian Creole talk, music and news with some other ethnic programming. The station has a brokered programming format, where hosts pay for their time on the air and may advertise their services and products. Most of the schedule is used by Radio Mega, which broadcasts in the U.S. and Haiti.

WJCC is a Class B station. By day, it is powered at 10,000 watts. But to reduce interference to other stations on 1700 AM, at night it drops its power to 1,000 watts. It uses a non-directional antenna. The transmitter is on NW 102nd Avenue near NW 138th Street in Hialeah. As part of the Expanded Band, there are only a handful of other radio stations in the U.S. and one in Mexico on 1700 AM.

== History ==
WJCC originated as the expanded band "twin" of an existing station on the standard AM band.

On March 17, 1997, the Federal Communications Commission (FCC) announced that 88 stations been given permission to move to newly available "Expanded Band" transmitting frequencies, ranging from 1610 to 1700 kHz. A radio station, at the time WCMQ, was authorized to move from 1210 to 1700 kHz. Its goal was to improve its signal, covering more of the Miami metropolitan area on the 1700 frequency. The call sign for the original WCMQ on 1210 AM was changed to WNMA on November 25, 1997, thus allowing a Construction Permit for the expanded band station on 1700 AM to inherit the historic WCMQ call letters on December 5, 1997. (The original CMQ 640 AM was a popular radio station in the 1940s and 50s in Cuba.)

AM 1700's call letters were changed to WRNU on February 1, 1999, and to WAFN on September 9, 1999. The station is notable as the first broadcasting home of South Florida sports radio personality Jorge Sedano, who began his career in 1999 as a host/update anchor/producer at WAFN ("The Fan"). He went on to a successful radio career with Fox Sports Radio, and later ESPN. During its time as "The Fan", WAFN carried programming from New York's WFAN 660 AM, including the syndicated Imus in the Morning.

AM 1700's call letters were changed again, to WJCC, on October 30, 2001.

The FCC's initial policy for expanded band stations was that both the original station and its expanded band counterpart could operate simultaneously for up to five years, after which owners would have to turn in one of the two licenses, depending on whether they preferred the new assignment or elected to remain on the original frequency. Due to this requirement, WJCC was deleted on February 23, 2006. However, numerous other joint standard/expanded band station pairs had been permitted to operate beyond the initial five-year deadline, and a petition to resume operations was granted, with WJCC's license restored on October 4, 2012. Since then the FCC deadline has been extended multiple times, and both stations have remained authorized. One restriction is that the FCC has generally required paired original and expanded band stations to remain under common ownership. Multicultural Broadcasting continues to own WNMA and WJCC, as well as WEXY 1520 AM, in the Miami radio market. As of 2026 the radiostation is off the air.
