= KTNO (AM) =

Radio station in Richardson, Texas

- Richardson, Texas; United States
- Broadcast area: Dallas–Fort Worth metroplex; Sherman–Denison metropolitan area
- Frequency: 1700 kHz
- Branding: Jalapeño 1700 AM

Programming
- Languages: Spanish and English
- Format: Tejano

Ownership
- Owner: Claro Communications, Ltd.; (Gerald Benavides)

History
- First air date: 1951
- Former call signs: KDSX; KTBK (1998–2005); KKLF (2005–2026)
- Call sign meaning: Was adopted with a Tejano format on February 1, 1993, at what is now KAMM

Technical information
- Licensing authority: FCC
- Facility ID: 86684
- Class: B
- Power: 5,000 watts (day); 1,000 watts (night)
- Transmitter coordinates: 33°25′23″N 96°39′45″W (day); 33°7′17″N 96°34′55″W (night)
- Translators: K239DA (95.7 MHz, Richardson)

Links
- Public license information: Public file; LMS
- Website: www.jalapenoradio.com/listen-to-kklf-jalapeno-radio-dallas/

KTNO (1700 AM) is a commercial radio station licensed to Richardson, Texas. Although the station's signal covers portions of the Dallas–Fort Worth metroplex, it mainly serves areas of North Texas that are north and east of the Metroplex. This station broadcasts on the AM expanded band. It is owned by Claro Communications, Ltd., with Gerald Benavides as the licensee. It broadcasts a Tejano radio format, using the monikers "Jalapeño Radio". The DJs speak both Spanish and English.

KTNO transmits with a daytime power of 5,000 watts, and a nighttime power of 1,000 watts to avoid interfering with other stations on 1700 AM. The transmitter is off West Forest Grove Road in Lucas, Texas. The station is licensed by iBiquity for digital HD Radio transmission but is not currently transmitting a digital signal. Because the license to broadcast HD Radio is perpetual, the station could resume digital broadcasts at any time. Programming can also be heard on 60-watt FM translator K239DA at 95.7 MHz in Richardson.

== History ==
The station originated as the expanded band "twin" of an existing station on the standard AM band.

KDSX was first licensed in 1948 to the Grayson Broadcasting Corporation in Denison, originally for daytime-only on 1220 kHz. In 1951, the station moved to 950 kHz, and in 1954, its community-of-license was changed to Denison-Sherman. KDSX first aired a Top 40 format. It also spawned FM station KDSX-FM in 1967 (now KYDA in Azle, Texas).

On March 17, 1997, the Federal Communications Commission (FCC) announced that 88 stations had been given permission to move to newly available "Expanded Band" transmitting frequencies, ranging from 1610 to 1700 kHz, with KDSX authorized to move from 950 to 1700 kHz.

A construction permit for the expanded band station was assigned the call letters KTBK on June 1, 1998. The FCC's policy was that both the original station and its expanded band counterpart could operate simultaneously for up to 5 years, after which owners would have to turn in one of the two licenses, depending on whether they preferred the new assignment or elected to remain on the original frequency. It was ultimately decided to transfer full operations to the expanded band station, and on January 10, 2006, the license for original station on 950 kHz, after successively changing its call letters to KKLF, KYNG and KZRA, was cancelled.

In 2005, the station on 1700 AM changed its own call letters to KKLF, a variation of KLIF, and also relocated to Richardson.

In 2011, Cumulus Media put KKLF and 11 other stations into a trust run by Scott Knoblauch (via Volt Radio, LLC) in preparation for Cumulus' acquisition of Citadel Broadcasting. As a result, the station's simulcast of KLIF ended in favor of an all-comedy format via the 24/7 Comedy Radio network. Originally, the comedy format was to launch on February 1, 2012, but it was delayed due to numerous missteps. KKLF officially changed formats to all-comedy on February 14.

In November 2013, KKLF was sold to Claro Communications through licensee Gerald Benavides, who previously owned low-power television station KVFW-LD; the purchase was consummated on March 5, 2014, at a price of US$1.25 million. On March 14, 2014, the station flipped from comedy to Tejano music as "Kick 1700". In November 2016, the station switched formats and started broadcasting classic hits, sports and news in Spanish with a new name as Banda 13 Radio.

In an application for special temporary authority (STA) filed with the FCC, Claro stated that a residence is near the KKLF night tower. The night tower site is the site for a proposed daytime operation with 10,000 watts with the same 90-degree-tall tower as is used for night operations. Because of the residence, KKLF has been granted an STA authorizing 1,000 watts unlimited operation.

On June 1, 2026, the station's call sign was changed to KTNO.

== Call sign history ==
The KTNO call sign was first used on a station broadcasting on 1570, and later, 1540 AM, and itself aired a Tejano format full-time from 1993 to 1997. Shortly afterwards, the call letters were transferred to a station on 1440 AM for a Spanish-language Christian format under the brand "Radio Luz". In 2019, KTNO and the "Radio Luz" programming were relocated to 620 AM where it remained until October 24, 2025, from there, it simulcast KWRD 100.7 FM until 620 ceased operations on April 13, 2026.
