= 1700 AM =

AM radio frequency

The following radio stations broadcast on AM frequency 1700 kHz: 1700 AM is a Regional broadcast frequency. It is the highest frequency allocated to the AM broadcast band in International Telecommunication Union (ITU) Region 2 (the Americas).

== Mexico ==
- XEPE-AM in Tecate, Baja California

== United States ==
All stations are Class B stations.

Call sign	City of license	Facility ID	Daytime power (kW)	Nighttime power (kW)	Transmitter coordinates
KTNO	Richardson, Texas	86684	5	1	33.121389°N 96.581944°W
KVNS	Brownsville, Texas	87142	8.8	0.88	25.949167°N 97.554167°W
WEUP	Huntsville, Alabama	87141	10	1	34.758889°N 86.643056°W
WJCC	Miami Springs, Florida	87169	10	1	25.900556°N 80.363889°W
WRCR	Haverstraw, New York	64556	10	1	41.096111°N 74.004722°W

== See also ==
- AM expanded band
- List of AM Expanded Band station assignments issued by the Federal Communications Commission on March 17, 1997
