= 1680 AM =

AM radio frequency

The following radio stations broadcast on AM frequency 1680 kHz: 1680 AM is a Regional broadcast frequency.

== México ==
- XECSIC-AM in Morelia, Michoacán

== United States ==
All stations operate with 10 kW during the daytime and are Class B stations.

| Call sign | City of license | Facility ID | Nighttime power (kW) | Transmitter coordinates |
|---|---|---|---|---|
| KGED | Fresno, California | 87176 | 1 | 36.660278°N 119.683611°W |
| KNTS | Seattle, Washington | 87153 | 1 | 47.655556°N 122.518056°W |
| KRJO | Monroe, Louisiana | 87167 | 1 | 32.456667°N 92.018333°W |
| WOKB | Winter Garden, Florida | 87164 | 1 | 28.568889°N 81.518889°W |
| WPRR | Ada, Michigan | 87106 | 0.68 | 42.935833°N 85.457222°W |
| WTTM | Lindenwold, New Jersey | 87111 | 1 | 39.8875°N 75.001389°W |

== See also ==
- AM expanded band
- List of AM Expanded Band station assignments issued by the Federal Communications Commission on March 17, 1997
