= KKEL (AM) =

Radio station in Hobbs, New Mexico (1938–1999)

Hobbs, New Mexico; United States
- Frequency: 1480 kHz

Programming
- Format: Defunct

Ownership
- Owner: Robert D. Coker and Judy Coker

History
- First air date: August 8, 1938
- Former call signs: KWEW (1938–1981); KUUX (1981–1988)
- Former frequencies: 1500 kHz (1938–1941); 1490 kHz (1941–1955)

Technical information
- Facility ID: 56795
- Power: 5,000 watts (daytime); 1,000 watts (nighttime)

KKEL (1480 kHz) was a commercial AM radio station in Hobbs, New Mexico. The station began broadcasting in 1938, and was deleted on July 2, 1999.

== History ==
KKEL made its formal debut, as KWEW, on August 8, 1938, which was owner W. E. Whitmore's birthday. The station initially broadcast daytime-only on 1500 kilohertz, with a 100 watt non-directional antenna. In 1940 KWEW's authorization was changed to unlimited hours of operation.

On March 29, 1941, under the provisions of the North American Regional Broadcasting Agreement, KWEW, along with most of the other stations on 1500 kHz, moved to 1490 kHz, which was followed by a power increase to 250 watts. In 1955, the station moved from 1490 kHz, a "local" frequency, to 1480 kHz, a "regional" frequency, which allowed for a power increase to 1,000 watts, although with a directional antenna at night. In 1959, the daytime power was increased to 5,000 watts.

In 1977, KWEW received the American Cancer Society's New Mexico state award, in recognition of the station's "Cancer Answer Line" program. The station call letters were changed to KUUX on January 26, 1981, and to KKEL on July 11, 1988.

=== Expanded Band assignment ===
On March 17, 1997 the Federal Communications Commission (FCC) announced that eighty-eight stations had been given permission to move to newly available "Expanded Band" transmitting frequencies, ranging from 1610 to 1700 kHz, with KKEL authorized to move from 1480 to 1670 kHz. However, the station never procured the construction permit needed to implement the authorization, so the expanded band station was never built.

=== Station deletion ===
The license for KKEL was cancelled on July 2, 1999.
