= WUVI (AM) =

Radio station at the University of the Virgin Islands in Charlotte Amalie

- Charlotte Amalie, U.S. Virgin Islands; United States
- Frequency: 1090 kHz

Ownership
- Owner: Three Angels Broadcasting Company, Inc.; (Three Angels Corporation)
- Operator: University of the Virgin Islands

History
- First air date: 1985
- Last air date: 2019
- Former call signs: WIBS (1985–1989); WGOD (1989–2012)
- Call sign meaning: University of the Virgin Islands

Technical information
- Facility ID: 66988
- Class: D
- Power: 250 watts (days only)
- Transmitter coordinates: 18°18′57″N 64°53′02″W
- Repeater: 97.3 WUVI-LP (John Brewers Bay)

WUVI (1090 AM) was a radio station licensed to Charlotte Amalie, U.S. Virgin Islands, United States. The station was owned by Three Angels Corporation and leased to the University of the Virgin Islands. Its license was cancelled September 23, 2019. The station aired a College radio format using student on-air talent from the university's radio program. News programming from Pacifica Radio was also broadcast. Programming continues on 97.3 WUVI-LP.

== History ==
This station received its original construction permit from the Federal Communications Commission (FCC) on August 28, 1985. The new station was assigned the call letters WIBS by the FCC on October 2, 1985. WIBS received its license to cover from the FCC on November 7, 1988.

In February 1989, Raphael A. Figueroa and Lucy E. Figueroa (doing business as Saint Thomas Broadcasters) reached an agreement to sell this station to Three Angels Corporation. The deal was approved by the FCC on July 5, 1989, and the transaction was consummated on July 31, 1989. The new owners had the FCC assign the WGOD call letters on October 5, 1989.

=== Expanded Band assignment ===
On March 17, 1997 the FCC announced that eighty-eight stations had been given permission to move to newly available "Expanded Band" transmitting frequencies, ranging from 1610 to 1700 kHz, with WGOD authorized to move from 1090 to 1690 kHz.

A construction permit for the expanded band station was assigned the call letters WIGT on August 12, 2010. The FCC's initial policy was that both the original station and its expanded band counterpart could operate simultaneously for up to five years, after which owners would have to turn in one of the two licenses, depending on whether they preferred the new assignment or elected to remain on the original frequency. This deadline was extended multiple times, and both stations remained authorized beyond the original time limit.

=== Later history ===
On September 14, 2012, the station changed its call sign to WUVI, in conjunction with Three Angels' lease of the station to the University of the Virgin Islands, which launched a college radio format on January 9, 2013.

WUVI was deleted on September 23, 2019.
