= WIGT =

Radio station in Charlotte Amalie, U.S. Virgin Islands

Charlotte Amalie; United States Virgin Islands
- Frequency: 1690 kHz

Ownership
- Owner: El Logos, Inc.

History
- First air date: 2010

Technical information
- Licensing authority: FCC
- Facility ID: 87157
- Class: B
- Power: 920 watts
- Transmitter coordinates: 18°18′57″N 64°53′2″W

Links
- Public license information: Public file; LMS

WIGT (1690 AM) is a currently silent Charlotte Amalie, U.S. Virgin Islands non-commercial radio station, owned by El Logos, Inc.

== History ==
WIGT originated as the expanded band "twin" of an existing station on the standard AM band. On March 17, 1997 the Federal Communications Commission (FCC) announced that 88 stations had been given permission to move to newly available "Expanded Band" transmitting frequencies, ranging from 1610 to 1700 kHz, with WGOD authorized to move from 1090 to 1690 kHz.

An application for the expanded band station was filed on June 16, 1997. The initial authorization specified that it would be for the standard U.S. "Model I" transmitter powers of 10,000 watts during the day and 1,000 watts at night. However, France filed an objection, because under an international agreement this resulted in impermissibly strong signals at its territories of Martinique and Guadeloupe, and the original Construction Permit (CP) was rescinded in 2000.

In 2006 a modified application was filed, specifying a power of 920 watts both day and night, and the resulting CP was assigned the call letters WIGT on August 12, 2010. The FCC's initial policy was that both the original station and its expanded band counterpart could operate simultaneously for up to five years, after which owners would have to turn in one of the two licenses, depending on whether they preferred the new assignment or elected to remain on the original frequency. This deadline was extended multiple times, and both stations remained authorized beyond the initial cut-off date. (The original station on 1090 AM, now holding the call letters WUVI, was eventually deleted, on September 23, 2019.)

In 2017, damage from Hurricane Irma silenced WIGT beginning on September 7. A Special Temporary Authority (STA) grant, renewed on June 18, 2018, was issued allowing the station to remain off the air while repairs were being made. WIGT resumed broadcasting on September 5, 2018, at a reduced power of 400 watts. The station was issued a series of STAs on September 7, 2018, March 19, 2019, September 23, 2019, April 14, 2020, November 3, 2020 and May 25, 2021, allowing it to continue operating with 400 watts while arrangements were being made to install a replacement 1,000-watt transmitter that would allow it to resume operations at its licensed power of 920 watts.

On June 9, 2025, the station's license was changed from commercial to non-commercial operation, under new owner, El Logos, Inc. On June 17, 2025, it was further granted permission to remain silent for up to 180 days, pending construction of a new transmitter site.
