= List of North American broadcast station classes =

This is a list of broadcast station classes applicable in much of North America under international agreements between the United States, Canada, and Mexico. Effective radiated power (ERP) and height above average terrain (HAAT) are listed unless otherwise noted.

All radio and television stations within 320 kilometers (199 miles) of the US-Canada or US-Mexico border must get approval by both the domestic and foreign agency. These agencies are Industry Canada/Canadian Radio-television and Telecommunications Commission (CRTC) in Canada, the Federal Communications Commission (FCC) in the US, and the Telecommunications Regulatory Commission (CRT) in Mexico.

== AM ==
This diagram illustrates how the AM radio spectrum is classified in North America. Blue: Clear-channel; classes A, B, and D Green: Regional; classes B and D Yellow: Local; classes B and C

=== Station class descriptions ===
All domestic (United States) AM stations are classified as A, B, C, or D.

- A (formerly I)—clear-channel stations—10 kW to 50 kW, 24 hours.
  - Class A stations are only protected within a 750-mile (1,207-kilometer) radius of the transmitter site.
  - The old Class I was divided into three: Class I-A, I-B, and I-N. NARBA distinguished between Class I-A, which were true clear-channel stations that did not share their channel with another Class I station, and Class I-B, in which a station operated with 50 kW at night but shared its channel with at least one other I-B station, requiring directional operation. This distinction was superseded by the Regional Agreement for the Medium Frequency Broadcasting Service in Region 2 (Rio Agreement), which instituted the ABCD class system in 1983.
  - The former Class I-As are omnidirectional, with the exception of 870 WWL New Orleans and 1030 WBZ Boston, which use directional antennas to put a better signal over their largest population areas.
  - Most former Class I-Bs are directional at night, although a few are also directional during days. (A handful of I-Bs did not have to use directional antennas: 680 KNBR San Francisco, 810 WGY Schenectady, 850 KOA Denver, 940 XEQ Mexico City, 1070 KNX Los Angeles, and 1070 CBA Moncton. KNX and CBA were far enough apart that both could operate without using a directional antenna. XEQ is far enough from Montreal that it did not need a directional antenna. KNBR and KOA are the only Class Is on their frequency but share those frequencies with several Class II-Bs.)
  - Former Class I-N stations exist only in Alaska, where they are too remote to interfere with other clear-channel stations in the contiguous 48 states. They are only held to Class B efficiency standards (although higher efficiency is acceptable).
  - No new Class A stations are licensed in the conterminous United States, although the FCC states it may be possible to license additional Class A stations in Alaska.
- B (formerly II and III)—regional stations—250 W to 50 kW, 24 hours.
  - Stations on the AM expanded band, 1610 kHz to 1700 kHz, are limited to 10 kW days and 1 kW nights, non-directionally.
  - Several expanded band stations operate DA-N or even DA-2 with up to 10 kW during all hours, after providing proof that such operations will not cause co- or adjacent-channel interference.
  - If under 250 W at night, the antenna must be efficient enough to radiate more than 140.82 mV/m at 1 km.
- C (formerly IV)—local unlimited-time stations—250 W to 1 kW, 24 hours.
  - Class C stations that were licensed at 100 W are grandfathered.
  - Rare Class Cs operate with directional arrays, such as KYPA and KHCB.
- D (formerly II-D, II-S, III-S)—daytimers—daytime 250 W to 50 kW, nighttime under 250 W, or off-air.
  - Field strength is limited to 140 mV/m (millivolts per meter) at 1 km.
  - No new class D stations are licensed, with the exception of Class B stations that are downgrading their nighttime operations to Class D (i.e., less than 250 W). The station's daytime operation is then also reclassified as Class D.
  - If a Class D station is on the air at night, it is not protected from any co-channel interference.
- TIS/HAR—travelers' information stations / highway advisory radio stations—Up to 10 W transmitter output power. Stations within US national parks are licensed by NTIA and not the FCC.
- Unlicensed broadcasting—(see low-power broadcasting)—100 mW DC input to final amplifier with a 3-meter (10-foot) maximum length radiator, no license needed, may be measured at edge of campus for school stations and neighborhood broadcasters.

Notes:

- In the Western Hemisphere's (ITU region 2), medium wave AM broadcasts are on channels spaced 10 kHz apart from 530 kHz to 1700 kHz, with certain classes restricted to subsets of the available frequencies.
- With few exceptions, Class A stations can be found only on the frequencies of 540 kHz, 640 to 780 kHz, 800 to 900 kHz, 940 kHz, 990 to 1140 kHz, 1160 to 1220 kHz, and 1500 to 1580 kHz. The exceptions are cited in relevant international treaties.
- While US and Canadian Class A stations are authorized to operate at a maximum of 50,000 watts both day and night (and a minimum of 10,000 watts at night, if grandfathered), certain existing Mexican Class A stations, and certain new Cuban Class A stations are authorized to operate at a higher power. Certain Mexican Class A stations are authorized to operate at less than 50,000 watts at night, if grandfathered, but may operate at up to 100,000 watts during the day.
- Class B and D stations can be found on any frequencies from 540 kHz to 1700 kHz except where frequencies have been reserved for Class C stations.
- Class C stations can be found in the lower 48 US states on the frequencies of 1230 kHz, 1240 kHz, 1340 kHz, 1400 kHz, 1450 kHz, and 1490 kHz (commonly known as "graveyard" frequencies). Other countries may use other frequencies for their Class C stations.
- American territories in ITU region 3 with AM broadcasting stations (Guam and the Northern Mariana Islands) use the 9 kHz spacing customary to the rest of the world. All stations are class B or lower.
- Canada also defines Class CC (Carrier Current, restricted to the premises) and LP. (less than 100 watts)
- TIS stations can be found on any frequency from 530 kHz to 1700 kHz in the US, but may only carry non-commercial messages without music. There is a network of TISs on 1710 in New Jersey.
- Low-power AM stations located on a school campus are allowed to be more powerful, so long as their signal strength does not exceed roughly 14 to 45 μV/m (microvolts per meter) (depending on frequency) at a distance of 30 meters (98.4 ft) from campus.

==== Former system ====
AM station classes were previously assigned Roman numerals from I to IV in the US, with subclasses indicated by a letter suffix. Replacement class A is equivalent to the old class I; class B is the old classes II and III, with class D being the II-D, II-S, and III-S subclasses; and class C is the old class IV.

The following conversion table compares the old AM station classes with the new AM station classes:

Old Domestic Station Class	New Domestic Station Class
I	A
II	B
III	B
IV	C
II-S	D
III-S	D
II-D (Daytime Only)	D

=== AM station classes and clear channels listed by frequency ===
The following chart lists frequencies on the broadcast company band, and which classes broadcast on these frequencies; Class A and Class B, 10,000 watt and higher (full-time) stations in North America which broadcast on clear-channel station frequencies are also shown.

By international agreement, Class A stations must be 10,000 watts and above, with a 50,000 watt maximum for the US and Canada, but no maximum for other governments in the region. Mexico, for example, typically runs 150,000 to 500,000 watts, but some stations are grandfathered at 10,000 to 20,000 watts at night; by treaty, these sub-50,000 watt Mexican stations may operate with a maximum of 100,000 watts during the daytime.

Because the AM broadcast band developed before technology suitable for directional antennas, there are numerous exceptions, such as the US use of 800 (kHz) and 900 non-directionally in Alaska, limited to 5 kW at night; and 1050 and 1220, directionally, in the continental US, and without time limits; each of these being assigned to specific cities (and each of these being Mexican Class I-A clear channels). In return for these limits on US stations, Mexico accepted limits on 830 and 1030 in Mexico City, non-directionally, restricted to 5 kW at night (both of these being US Class I-A clear channels).

Channel Type	Frequency (kHz)	Available Classes	Assignment Old class designation in ()
—	530	—	In the US, reserved for low power AM Travelers' Information Stations
Clear	540	A, B, D	CBK Watrous, Saskatchewan: Class A (I-A); CBT Grand Falls-Windsor, Newfoundland and Labrador: Class A (I-B); XEWA San Luis Potosí, San Luis Potosí: Class A (I-A); WFLF Pine Hills, Florida: Class B (II-B)
Regional	550	(A), B, D	CMBV Wajay, Cuba: Class A "Rio" grant: 500 kW all hours; special grant of a Cuban Class A on a regional channel
Regional	560	B, D	
Regional	570	(A), B, D	CMEA Santa Clara, Cuba: Class A "Rio" grant: 30 kW all hours; special grant of a Cuban Class A on a regional channel
Regional	580	(A), B, D	CMAA Pinar del Rio, Cuba: Class A "Rio" grant: 30 kW all hours; special grant of a Cuban Class A on a regional channel KMJ Fresno, California Class B (III-A) 50 kW all hours; directional all hours
Regional	590	(A), B, D	CMCA San Antonio Vegas, Cuba: Class A "Rio" grant: 150 kW all hours; special grant of a Cuban Class A on a regional channel
Regional	600	(A), B, D	CMKA San German, Cuba: Class A "Rio" grant: 150 kW all hours; special grant of a Cuban Class A on a regional channel
Regional	610	B, D	
Regional	620	(A), B, D	CMDA Colon, Cuba: Class A "Rio" grant: 30 kW all hours; special grant of a Cuban Class A on a regional channel
Regional	630	(A), B, D	CMHA Camaguey, Cuba: Class A "Rio" grant: 30 kW all hours; special grant of a Cuban Class A on a regional channel
Clear	640	A, B, D	KFI Los Angeles, California: Class A (I-A); KYUK Bethel, Alaska: Class A (I-N); CBN St. John's, Newfoundland and Labrador: Class A (I-B) NARBA grant: 10 kW non-directional all hours
Clear	650	A, B, D	WSM Nashville, Tennessee: Class A (I-A); KENI Anchorage, Alaska: Class A (I-N)
Clear	660	A, B, D	WFAN New York City: Class A (I-A); KFAR Fairbanks, Alaska: Class A (I-N); KTNN Window Rock, Arizona: Class B (II-B); CMDC Colon, Cuba: Class A "Rio" grant: 30 kW all hours; special grant of a Cuban Class A on a US clear channel
Clear	670	A, B, D	WSCR Chicago, Illinois: Class A (I-A); KDLG Dillingham, Alaska: Class A (I-N); KBOI Boise, Idaho: Class B (II-A); CMBC Arroyo Arena, Cuba: Class A "Rio" grant: 50 kW all hours; special grant of a Cuban Class A on a US clear channel
Clear	680	A, B, D	KNBR San Francisco, California: Class A (I-B) ND-U; KBRW Barrow, Alaska: Class A (I-N); WRKO Boston, Massachusetts: Class B (II-B); WCBM Baltimore, Maryland: Class B (II-B); WPTF Raleigh, North Carolina: Class B (II-B)
Clear	690	A, B, D	CKGM Montreal, Quebec: Class A (I-A); CBU Vancouver, British Columbia: Class B (II-B); XEWW Tijuana, Baja California: Class A (I-B) NARBA grant: 50 kW, directional all hours; currently 77 kW days, 50 kW nights, directional all hours WOKV Jacksonville, Florida: Class B (II-B); CMEC Santa Clara, Cuba: Class A "Rio" grant: 50 kW all hours; special grant of a Cuban Class A on a Canadian clear channel
Clear	700	A, B, D	WLW Cincinnati, Ohio: Class A (I-A); KBYR Anchorage, Alaska: Class A (I-N)
Clear	710	A, B, D	WOR New York City: Class A (I-B); KIRO Seattle, Washington: Class A (I-B); KSPN Los Angeles, California: Class B (II-B); WAQI Miami, Florida: Class B (II-B)
Clear	720	A, B, D	WGN Chicago, Illinois: Class A (I-A); KOTZ Kotzebue, Alaska: Class A (I-N)
Clear	730	A, B, D	CKAC Montreal, Quebec: Class A (II-B) ("Rio" grant: promotion to Class A); XEX Mexico City: Class A (I-A); CMHC Camaguey, Cuba: Class A "Rio" grant: 30 kW all hours; special grant of a Cuban Class A on a Mexican clear channel
Clear	740	A, B, D	CFZM Toronto, Ontario: Class A (I-A); KCBS San Francisco, California: Class B (II-B) Formerly KQW San Jose, California; WYGM Orlando, Florida: Class B (II-B); KRMG Tulsa, Oklahoma: Class B (II-B); KTRH Houston, Texas: Class B (II-B); CMAC Pinar del Rio, Cuba: Class A "Rio" grant: 30 kW all hours; special grant of a Cuban Class A on a Canadian clear channel
Clear	750	A, B, D	WSB Atlanta, Georgia: Class A (I-A); KFQD Anchorage, Alaska: Class A (I-N); CBGY Bonavista, Newfoundland and Labrador: Class A (I-B) (New station; Grandfathered at 10 kW); KMMJ Grand Island, Nebraska: Class B (II-B); KXTG Portland, Oregon: Class B (II-B)
Clear	760	A, B, D	WJR Detroit, Michigan: Class A (I-A); KGB San Diego, California: Class B (II-B); CMKC Cacocun, Cuba: Class A "Rio" grant: 75 kW all hours; special grant of a Cuban Class A on a US clear channel
Clear	770	A, B, D	WABC New York City: Class A (I-A); KKOB Albuquerque, New Mexico: Class B (II-A); KCHU Valdez, Alaska: Class A (I-N); KTTH Seattle, Washington: Class B (II-B)
Clear	780	A, B, D	WBBM Chicago, Illinois: Class A (I-A); KNOM Nome, Alaska: Class A (I-N); KKOH Reno, Nevada: Class B (II-A)
Regional	790	(A), B, D	CMAC Guanabacoba, Cuba: Class A "Rio" grant: 30 kW all hours; special grant of a Cuban Class A on a regional channel
Clear	800	A, B, D	XEROK Ciudad Juárez, Chihuahua: Class A (I-A); CKLW Windsor, Ontario: Class B (II-B); CMEB Santa Clara, Cuba: Class A "Rio" grant: 30 kW all hours; special grant of a Cuban Class A on a Mexican clear channel
Clear	810	A, B, D	KSFO San Francisco, California: Class A (I-B); WGY Schenectady, New York: Class A (I-B) ND-U, but KSFO was the originally assigned dominant station WHB Kansas City, Missouri: Class B (II-B); WKVM San Juan, Puerto Rico: Class B (II-B)
Clear	820	A, B, D	WBAP Fort Worth, Texas: Class A (I-A); KCBF Fairbanks, Alaska: Class A (I-N)
Clear	830	A, B, D	WCCO Minneapolis, Minnesota: Class A (I-A); KLAA Orange, California: Class B (II-B); XEITE Mexico City, Mexico: Class B (II-B) NARBA grant: 5 kW all hours; operates 10 kW days, 5 kW nights
Clear	840	A, B, D	WHAS Louisville, Kentucky: Class A (I-A); KXNT North Las Vegas, Nevada: Class B (II-B)
Clear	850	A, B, D	KOA Denver, Colorado: Class A (I-B) ND-U; KICY Nome, Alaska: Class A (I-N); WEEI Boston, Massachusetts: Class B (II-B); WTAR Norfolk, Virginia: Class B (II-B)
Clear	860	A, B, D	CJBC Toronto, Ontario: Class A (I-A); KTRB San Francisco, California: Class B (II-B) operates at 7.5 kW nights CMDB Colon, Cuba: Class A "Rio" grant: 30 kW all hours; special grant of a Cuban Class A on a Canadian clear channel
Clear	870	A, B, D	WWL New Orleans, Louisiana: Class A (I-A)
Clear	880	A, B, D	WHSQ New York City: Class A (I-A); KRVN Lexington, Nebraska: Class B (II-A); CMAB Pinar del Rio, Cuba: Class A "Rio" grant: 30 kW all hours; special grant of a Cuban Class A on a US clear channel
Clear	890	A, B, D	WLS Chicago, Illinois: Class A (I-A); KBBI Homer, Alaska: Class A (I-N); KDXU St. George, Utah: Class B (II-A); CMHB Camaguey, Cuba: Class A "Rio" grant: 30 kW all hours; special grant of a Cuban Class A on a US clear channel
Clear	900	A, B, D	XEW Mexico City: Class A (I-A); CKBI Prince Albert, Saskatchewan: Class A (II-B); CMKB Cacocun, Cuba: Class A "Rio" grant: 200 kW days, 50 kW nights; special grant of a Cuban Class A on a Mexican clear channel
Regional	910	(A), B, D	CMAC Guanabacoba, Cuba: Class A "Rio" grant: 75 kW all hours; special grant of a Cuban Class A on a regional channel
Regional	920	B, D	
Regional	930	B, D	
Clear	940	A, B, D	CINW Montreal, Quebec: Class A (I-B); XEQ Mexico City: Class A (I-B) ND-U; KFIG Fresno, California: Class B (II-B)
Regional	950	B, D	KJR Seattle, Washington Class B (II-B) 50 kW all hours; directional all hours WWJ Detroit, Michigan: Class B (II-B) 50 kW all hours; directional all hours
Regional	960	B, D	
Regional	970	B, D	
Regional	980	A (only CKNW), B, D	CKNW New Westminster, British Columbia: Class A
Clear	990	A, B, D	CBW Winnipeg, Manitoba: Class A (I-A); CBY Corner Brook, Newfoundland and Labrador: Class A (I-B); WTLN Orlando, Florida: Class B (II-B)
Clear	1000	A, B, D	WMVP Chicago, Illinois: Class A (I-B); KNWN Seattle, Washington: Class A (I-B); XEOY Mexico City, Mexico: Class A (I-B) NARBA grant: 10 kW all hours; operates 50 kW days, 10 kW nights
Clear	1010	A, B, D	CBR Calgary, Alberta: Class A (I-A); CFRB Toronto, Ontario: Class A (II-B) (Class II-B promoted to Class A); WINS New York City: Class B (II-B); CMBX Wajay, Cuba: Class A "Rio" grant: 500 kW all hours; special grant of a Cuban Class A on a Canadian clear channel
Clear	1020	A, B, D	KDKA Pittsburgh, Pennsylvania: Class A (I-A); KVNT Eagle River, Alaska: Class A (I-N); KCKN Roswell, New Mexico: Class B (II-A); KTNQ Los Angeles, California: Class B (II-B)
Clear	1030	A, B, D	WBZ Boston, Massachusetts: Class A (I-A); KTWO Casper, Wyoming: Class B (II-A); XEQR Mexico City, Mexico: Class B (II-B) NARBA grant: 5 kW all hours; operates 50 kW days, 5 kW nights
Clear	1040	A, B, D	WHO Des Moines, Iowa: Class A (I-A)
Clear	1050	A, B, D	CHUM Toronto, Ontario: Class B (II-B); XEG Monterrey, Nuevo León: Class A (I-A); WEPN New York City: Class B (II-B) NARBA grant: 50 kW all hours, directional all hours;
Clear	1060	A, B, D	KYW Philadelphia, Pennsylvania: Class A (I-B); XEEP Mexico City: Class A (I-B) NARBA grant: 20 kW all hours; operates 50 kW days, 20 kW nights
Clear	1070	A, B, D	KNX Los Angeles, California: Class A (I-B) ND-U; CBA Moncton, New Brunswick: Class A (I-B) ND-U (Silent)
Clear	1080	A, B, D	WTIC Hartford, Connecticut: Class A (I-B); KRLD Dallas, Texas: Class A (I-B); KOAN Anchorage, Alaska: Class A (I-N); KRSK Portland, Oregon: Class B (II-B)
Clear	1090	A, B, D	KAAY Little Rock, Arkansas: Class A (I-B); WBAL Baltimore, Maryland: Class A (I-B); XEPRS Rosarito Beach, Baja California: Class A (I-B); KPTR Seattle, Washington: Class B (II-B)
Clear	1100	A, B, D	WTAM Cleveland, Ohio: Class A (I-A); KNZZ Grand Junction, Colorado: Class B (II-A); KFAX San Francisco, California: Class B (II-B)
Clear	1110	A, B, D	WBT Charlotte, North Carolina: Class A (I-B); KFAB Omaha, Nebraska: Class A (I-B); KWVE Pasadena, California: Class B (II-B)
Clear	1120	A, B, D	KMOX St. Louis, Missouri: Class A (I-A); KPNW Eugene, Oregon: Class B (II-A)
Clear	1130	A, B, D	KWKH Shreveport, Louisiana: Class A (I-B); WBBR New York City: Class A (I-B); CKWX Vancouver, British Columbia: Class A (I-B); KTLK Minneapolis, Minnesota: Class B (II-B)
Clear	1140	A, B, D	WRVA Richmond, Virginia: Class A (I-B); XEMR Apodaca, Nuevo León: Class A (I-B); KHTK Sacramento, California: Class B (II-B)
Regional	1150	B, D	
Clear	1160	A, B, D	KSL Salt Lake City, Utah: Class A (I-A); WYLL Chicago, Illinois: Class B (II-B)
Clear	1170	A, B, D	KOTV Tulsa, Oklahoma: Class A (I-B); WWVA Wheeling, West Virginia: Class A (I-B); KJNP North Pole, Alaska: Class A (I-N)
Clear	1180	A, B, D	WHAM Rochester, New York: Class A (I-A); KOFI Kalispell, Montana: Class B (II-A)
Clear	1190	A, B, D	KEX Portland, Oregon: Class A (I-B); WOWO Fort Wayne, Indiana: Class B (I-B) Former I-B downgraded to Class B by licensee's request; 9.8 kW nights WLIB New York City: Class B (II-B) 10 kW days, 30 kW nights XEWK-AM Guadalajara, Jalisco, Mexico: Class A (I-B) NARBA grant: 10 kW all hours; operates 50 kW days, 10 kW nights
Clear	1200	A, B, D	WOAI San Antonio, Texas: Class A (I-A); WMUZ Taylor, Michigan: Class B (II-B)
Clear	1210	A, B, D	WPHT Philadelphia, Pennsylvania: Class A (I-A); KGYN Guymon, Oklahoma: Class B (II-A)
Clear	1220	A, B, D	XEB Mexico City: Class A (I-A); WHKW Cleveland, Ohio: Class B (II-B) NARBA grant: 50 kW all hours, directional all hours;
Regional	1230	B	Stations in Alaska, Hawaii, Puerto Rico, and the United States Virgin Islands
Local	1230	C	Stations in conterminous 48 states
Regional	1240	B	Stations in Alaska, Hawaii, Puerto Rico, and the United States Virgin Islands
Local	1240	C	Stations in conterminous 48 states
Regional	1250	B, D	
Regional	1260	A (only CFRN), B, D	CFRN Edmonton, Alberta: Class A (III-B) Class III-B promoted to Class A, but operating on a Class III frequency
Regional	1270	B, D	
Regional	1280	B, D	
Regional	1290	B, D	
Regional	1300	B, D	
Regional	1310	B, D	
Regional	1320	B, D	
Regional	1330	B, D	
Regional	1340	B	Stations in Alaska, Hawaii, Puerto Rico, and the United States Virgin Islands
Local	1340	C	Stations in conterminous 48 states
Regional	1350	B, D	
Regional	1360	B, D	
Regional	1370	B, D	
Regional	1380	B, D	KRKO Everett, Washington Class B (III-A) 50 kW all hours; directional nights
Regional	1390	B, D	
Regional	1400	B	Stations in Alaska, Hawaii, Puerto Rico, and the United States Virgin Islands
Local	1400	C	Stations in conterminous 48 states
Regional	1410	B, D	
Regional	1420	B, D	
Regional	1430	B, D	
Regional	1440	B, D	
Regional	1450	B	Stations in Alaska, Hawaii, Puerto Rico, and the United States Virgin Islands
Local	1450	C	Stations in conterminous 48 states
Regional	1460	B, D	
Regional	1470	B, D	
Regional	1480	B, D	
Regional	1490	B	Stations in Alaska, Hawaii, Puerto Rico, and the United States Virgin Islands
Local	1490	C	Stations in conterminous 48 states
Clear	1500	A, B, D	WFED Washington, D.C.: Class A (I-B); KSTP Saint Paul, Minnesota: Class A (I-B)
Clear	1510	A, B, D	WLAC Nashville, Tennessee: Class A (I-B); WMEX Boston, Massachusetts: Class B (II-B) downgraded to 10 kW days, 100 watts nights, non-directional at all times KGA Spokane, Washington: Class B (I-B) Former I-B downgraded to Class B by licensee's request; 15 kW nights
Clear	1520	A, B, D	WWKB Buffalo, New York: Class A (I-B); KOKC Oklahoma City, Oklahoma: Class A (I-B); KGDD Oregon City, Oregon: Class B (II-B); KKXA Snohomish, Washington Class B (II-B) 50 kW all hours; directional all hours
Clear	1530	A, B, D	KFBK Sacramento, California: Class A (I-B); WCKY Cincinnati, Ohio: Class A (I-B)
Clear	1540	A, B, D	KXEL Waterloo, Iowa: Class A (I-B); ZNS-1 Nassau, Bahamas: Class A (I-A); KMPC Los Angeles, California: Class B (II-B)
Clear	1550	A, B, D	XERUV Xalapa, Veracruz: Class A (I-B) NARBA grant: 10 kW non-directional CBEF Windsor, Ontario: Class A (I-B) NARBA grant: 10 kW directional all hours KKOV Vancouver, Washington: Class B (II-B)
Clear	1560	A, B, D	KNZR Bakersfield, California: Class A (I-B) Only US Class A grandfathered at 10 kW nights, increased daytime power to 25 kW; WFME New York City: Class A (I-B)
Clear	1570	A, B, D	XERF Ciudad Acuña, Coahuila: Class A (I-A) NARBA grant: 250 kW, now operating at 100 kW
Clear	1580	A, B, D	CKDO Oshawa, Ontario: Class A (I-A) operating at 10 kW; KBLA Santa Monica, California: Class B (II-B)
Regional	1590	B, D	
Regional	1600	B, D	
Regional (Expanded)	1610		In the US, used solely by low power AM Travelers' Information Stations.
Regional (Expanded)	1620	B	
Regional (Expanded)	1630	B	
Regional (Expanded)	1640	B	
Regional (Expanded)	1650	B	
Regional (Expanded)	1660	B	
Regional (Expanded)	1670	B	
Regional (Expanded)	1680	B	
Regional (Expanded)	1690	B	
Regional (Expanded)	1700	B	

== FM ==
=== Station class description ===
Class	Effective Radiated Power (ERP, calculated using transmitter power and antenna HAAT)	Antenna Height Above Average Terrain (HAAT)	Reference distance
C	100 kW (or higher for grandfathered stations)	300 to 600 m (984 to 1,969 ft)	91.8 km (57.0 mi)
C0	100 kW	300 to 450 m (984 to 1,476 ft)	83.4 km (51.8 mi)
C1	up to 100 kW	under 300 m (984 ft)	83.4 km (51.8 mi)
C2	up to 50 kW	up to 150 m (492 ft)	52.2 km (32.4 mi)
C3	up to 25 kW	up to 100 m (328 ft)	39.1 km (24.3 mi)
C4 (US rulemaking)	up to 12 kW	up to 100 m (328 ft)	33.3 km (20.7 mi)
B	up to 50 kW	up to 150 m (492 ft)	65.1 km (40.5 mi)
B1	up to 25 kW	up to 100 m (328 ft)	44.7 km (27.8 mi)
A	100 W to 6 kW (3 kW in Mexico)	up to 100 m (328 ft)	28.3 km (17.6 mi) (24 km (15 mi) in Mexico)
A1 (Canada)	50 W to 250 W	up to 100 m (328 ft)	18 km (11 mi)
AA (Mexico)	up to 6 kW (the former limit for A)	up to 100 m (328 ft)	28 km (17 mi)
D	up to 250 W ERP except US non-translators to 10W TPO up to 50 W (Mexico)	unlimited up to 45 m (148 ft) (Mexico)	unspecified 5 km (3 mi) (Mexico)
L1 (US, also LP100)	50 W to 100 W	up to 30 m (98 ft)	5.6 km (3.5 mi)
L2 (US, also LP10)	1 W to 10 W	up to 30 m (98 ft)	3.2 km (2.0 mi)
LP (Canada)	10-50 W		
VLP (Canada)	up to 10 W		
unlicensed	signal strength of 250 μV/m (US), 100 μV/m (Canada)	unspecified	measured at 3 m (10 ft) (US), 30 m (98 ft) (Canada)

Notes:

- Canada protects all radio stations out to a signal strength of 0.5mV/m (54dBu), whereas only commercial B stations in the US are. Commercial B1 in the US is 0.7mV/m (57dBu), and all other stations are 1.0mV/m (60dBu). Noncommercial-band stations (88.1 to 91.9) are not afforded this protection, and are treated as C3 and C2 even when they are B1 or B. C3 and C2 may also be reported internationally as B1 and B, respectively.
- Class C0 is for former C stations, demoted at request of another station which needs the downgrade to accommodate its own facilities.
- In practice, many stations are above the maximum HAAT for a particular class, and correspondingly must downgrade their power to remain below the reference distance. Conversely, they may not increase power if they are below maximum HAAT.
- All class D (including L1 and L2 LPFM and translator) stations are secondary in the US, and can be bumped or forced off-air completely, even if they are not just a repeater and are the only station a licensee has.
- The United States is divided into regions that have different restrictions for FM stations. Zone I (much of the US Northeast and Midwest) and I-A (most of California, plus Puerto Rico) is limited to classes B and B1, while Zone II (everything else) has only the C classes. All areas have the same classes for A and D.
- Power and height restrictions were put in place in 1962. A number of previously existing stations were grandfathered in, such as KRUZ in Santa Barbara, California, and WLFP in Memphis, Tennessee.

The following table lists the various classes of FM stations, the reference facilities for each station class, and the protected and city grade contours for each station class:

FM station class	Reference (maximum) facilities for station class (ERP / HAAT)	FM protected or primary service contour	Distance to protected or primary service contour	Distance to 70 dBu city-grade or principal community coverage contour
Class A	6 kW; 100 m (328 ft)	60 dBu (1.0mV/m)	28.3 km (17.6 mi)	16.2 km (10.1 mi)
Class B1	25 kW; 100 m (328 ft)	57 dBu (0.7mV/m)	44.7 km (27.8 mi)	23.2 km (14.4 mi)
Class B	50 kW; 150 m (492 ft)	54 dBu (0.5mV/m)	65.1 km (40.5 mi)	32.6 km (20.3 mi)
Class C3	25 kW; 100 m (328 ft)	60 dBu (1.0mV/m)	39.1 km (24.3 mi)	23.2 km (14.4 mi)
Class C2	50 kW; 150 m (492 ft)	60 dBu (1.0mV/m)	52.2 km (32.4 mi)	32.6 km (20.3 mi)
Class C1	100 kW; 299 m (981 ft)	60 dBu (1.0mV/m)	72.3 km (44.9 mi)	50.0 km (31.1 mi)
Class C0	100 kW; 450 m (1,476 ft)	60 dBu (1.0mV/m)	83.4 km (51.8 mi)	59.0 km (36.7 mi)
Class C	100 kW; 600 m (1,969 ft)	60 dBu (1.0mV/m)	91.8 km (57.0 mi)	67.7 km (42.1 mi)

Historically, there were local "Class A" frequencies (like AM radio's class C stations) to which only class A stations would be allocated and the other frequencies could not have a class A. According to the 1982 FCC rules and regulations, those frequencies were: 92.1, 92.7, 93.5, 94.3, 95.3, 95.9, 96.7, 97.7, 98.3, 99.3, 100.1, 100.9, 101.7, 102.3, 103.1, 103.9, 104.9, 105.5, 106.3, and 107.1. Stations on those 20 frequencies were limited to having equivalent signals no greater than 3KW at 300 feet (91 meters) above average terrain.

=== FM zones ===
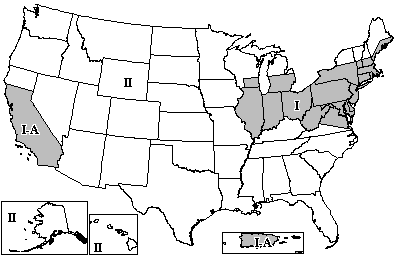
FM broadcast zones in the US

The US is divided into three zones for FM broadcasting: I, I-A and II. The zone where a station is located may limit the choices of broadcast class available to a given FM station.

Zone I in the US includes all of Connecticut, the District of Columbia, Delaware, Illinois, Indiana, Massachusetts, Maryland, New Jersey, Ohio, Pennsylvania, Rhode Island, and West Virginia. It also includes the areas south of latitude 43.5°N in Michigan, New Hampshire, New York, and Vermont; as well as coastal Maine, southeastern Wisconsin, and northern and eastern Virginia.

Zone I-A includes California south of 40°N, as well as Puerto Rico and the US Virgin Islands.

Zone II includes the remainder of the continental US, plus Alaska and Hawaii.

In Zones I and I-A, there are no Class C, C0, or C1 stations. However, there are a few Class B stations with grandfathered power limits in excess of 50 KW, such as WETA (licensed for Washington DC in zone I, at a power of 75 kW ERP), WNCI (Columbus, Ohio, in zone I, at 175 kW ERP), KPFK (Los Angeles in zone I-A, at 110 KW ERP), and the most extreme example being WBCT (Grand Rapids, Michigan, in zone I, at 320 kW ERP).

== TV ==
=== Full-power stations in the US ===
- VHF low (2–6): 100 kW video analog at 1,000 feet (305 meters) in Zone I and 2,000 feet (610 meters) in Zone II and Zone III above average terrain; 10 kW in Zone I and 45 kW in Zone II and Zone III digital at 1,000 feet (305 meters) above average terrain
- VHF high (7–13): 316 kW video analog at 1,000 feet (305 meters) in Zone I and 2,000 feet (610 meters) in Zone II and Zone III above average terrain; 30 kW in Zone I and 160 kW in Zone II and Zone III digital at 1,000 feet (305 meters) above average terrain
- UHF (14–36): 5 MW (5,000 kW) video analog at 2,000 feet (610 meters) above average terrain; 1 MW (1,000 kW) digital at 2,000 feet (610 meters) above average terrain

Notes:

All full-power analog television station transmissions in the US were terminated at midnight Eastern Daylight Time on June 12, 2009. Many broadcasters replaced their analog signal with their digital ATSC signal on the same transmission channel at that time.

- All US digital stations received a -DT suffix during the analog-to-digital transition. At analog shutdown, the FCC assigned to each digital station the call sign its associated analog station had used. (with a -TV suffix if the analog station had this suffix, without the -TV suffix if the analog station didn't have it). Stations could optionally choose to keep the -DT suffix. Most stations did not keep the -DT suffix.
- For US analog stations, the -TV suffix was required if there was a radio station with the same three-letter or four-letter callsign. Stations not required to use the -TV suffix may optionally request it if desired.
- Analog audio power was limited to 22% of video.

=== Full-power stations in Canada ===
- Class A: UHF, 10 kW video/100 m (328 ft) EHAAT
- Class B: UHF, 100 kW video/150 m (492 ft) EHAAT
- Class C: UHF, 1 MW (1,000 kW) video/300 m (984 ft) EHAAT (?)
- Class D: UHF, more than 1 MW (1,000 kW)/300 m (984 ft) EHAAT
- Class R: VHF, 100 kW low-band (channels 2–6), 325 kW high-band. (channels 7–13)
- Class S: VHF, more than 100 kW low-band/325 kW high-band.

Notes:

- Official definitions of these classes are difficult to locate. The values above are inferred from the Industry Canada database. There is some ambiguity about the difference between Classes C and D.
- Power-level limitations are not firmly enforced in Canada, and Industry Canada has been known to license stations for power levels much higher than the generally accepted limits. For example, CFRN-TV in Edmonton, Alberta operated on Channel 3 at over 600 kW but was not subject to international co-ordination due to its location 500 km (311 mi) north of the border.
- In Canada, the callsigns of all private TV stations have the -TV suffix. Most CBC Television and Ici Radio-Canada Télé TV callsigns end in the letter T and have no suffix. A few Radio-Canada stations, purchased by the CBC from private owners, retain the old -TV callsigns.
- Canadian digital stations all receive the -DT suffix. (this includes CBC and Radio-Canada stations) The Industry Canada database shows -PT suffixes for the channel allotments for permanent post-transition digital operation but when licences are issued for these permanent digital stations, -DT callsigns are used.

=== Low-power TV (US) ===
LPTV (secondary) (suffix: -LP, or a sequential-numbered callsign in format W##XX with no suffix for analog or with -D suffix for digital, or -LD for low-power digital stations):

- VHF: 3 kW analog video; 3 kW digital
- UHF: 150 kW analog video; 15 kW digital
- Experimental
- Unlicensed: not allowed except for medical telemetry, and certain wireless microphones

The LPTV (low-power television) service was created in 1982 by the FCC to allocate channels for smaller, local stations, and community channels, such as public access stations. LPTV stations that meet additional requirements such as children's "E/I" core programming and Emergency Alert System broadcasting capabilities can qualify for a Class A (-CA) license.

Broadcast translators, boosters, and other LPTV stations are considered secondary to full-power stations, unless they have upgraded to class A. Class A is still considered LPTV with respect to stations in Canada and Mexico.

==== Class A television (US) ====
Class-A stations (US) (suffix: -CA or -CD for digital class A):

- VHF: 3 kW analog video; 3 kW digital
- UHF: 150 kW analog video; 15 kW digital

The class-A television class is a variant of LPTV created in 2000 by the FCC to allocate and protect some low-power affiliates. Class-A stations are still low-power, but are protected from RF interference and from having to change channel should a full-service station request that channel.

Additionally, class-A stations, LPTV stations, and translators are the only stations currently authorized to broadcast both analog and digital signals, unlike full-power stations which must broadcast a digital signal only.

=== Low-power TV (Canada) ===
In Canada, there is no formal transmission power below which a television transmitter is considered broadcasting at low power. Industry Canada considers that a low power digital television undertaking "shall not normally extend a distance of 20 km in any direction from the antenna site," based on the determined noise-limited bounding contour.

=== Mexico ===
All digital television stations in Mexico have -TDT callsign suffixes. Analog stations, which existed until December 31, 2016, had -TV callsign suffixes.

The equivalent of low power or translator service in Mexico is the equipo complementario de zona de sombra, which is intended only to fill in gaps between a station's expected and actual service area caused by terrain; a station of this type shares the callsign of another station. In analog, these services often were broadcast on the same or adjacent channels to their parent station, except in certain areas with tight packing of television stations (such as central Mexico). In digital, these services usually operate on the same RF channel as their parent station, except for those with conflicting full-power applications (XHBS-TDT Cd. Obregón, Son., channel 30 instead of 25), in certain other cases where it is technically not feasible (XHAW-TDT Guadalupe, NL, channel 26 instead of 25) or to make way for eventual repacking on upper UHF (XHPNW-TDT has four shadows on 33, its post-repacking channel, instead of 39).

Equipos complementarios can relay their parent station, or a station that carries 75% or more of the same programming as its parent station.

Stations of either type may have unusually low or high effective radiated powers. XHSMI-TDT in Oaxaca is licensed for two watts in digital. The highest-powered shadows are XEQ-TDT Toluca and XHBS-TDT Ciudad Obregón, both at 200 kW.

=== FCC service table ===
The United States Federal Communications Commission lists the following services on their website for television broadcasting:

Broadcast class	Service	Suffixes used or call sign examples
Television allotment (analog)	TA	An allocation of a frequency to a city of license for which no corresponding call sign or license has been assigned. FCC placeholder for possible future construction permits or frequencies allocated to non-US broadcast use. No call sign, identifier is a date (yymmdd) followed by a sequential two-letter value in the US FCC database.
Full-service TV (analog)	TV	-TV or none (such as "KRON-TV" and "KTLA") Since the shutdown of all full power analog stations in June 2009, used only for historical records.
Class A (analog)	CA	-CA, or a translator-style call sign (such as "KTFB-CA")
Low-power station (analog) or translator	LP	-LP, or a translator-style call sign (such as "KDMD-LP" and "K13IO" with the 2 digits denoting the channel of operation)
TV boosters	TB	Rare. These use the parent station's call sign plus a sequential number, such as WSTE1, WSTE2, WSTE3. Nameplates for on-channel repeaters bear the parent station's call sign, followed by "booster". See distributed transmission. If the station is digital, and has on-channel boosters, they would typically be named WSTE-DT1, WSTE-DT2, WSTE-DT3 and so on.
TV auxiliary (analog backup) service	TS	no specific suffix (uses same call sign as main transmitter)
NTSC (analog) petition for a channel change	NN	no specific suffix; uses same call sign as the station which made a request for a number/channel change (for NTSC/analog stations, and low-power repeaters, such as those registered as TX).
Digital Television (full power)	DT	-DT, -TV or none (such as KGLA-DT, WSKY-TV or KOHD). Some stations formerly used -HD, but this has become obsolete (though it may sometimes still be seen identifying the station's main subchannel in a PSIP listing). The -DT suffix, optional for digital-only stations, was used primarily to distinguish a DTV transmission from an analog signal of the same broadcast (or is seen identifying the main subchannel of a station on a PSIP display); likewise, -TV is optional except if the eponymous radio stations exist. A similar suffix -DTV, is used on all television stations in Japan.
Digital Class-A	CD	-CD (such as "WDNI-CD" and "WYYW-CD") Some stations briefly used -DC as well (this has since become obsolete). A scant few still use translator-style call signs with the -D suffix (such as "K36ID-D").
Digital Low-power	LD	-LD or translator-style calls with -D suffix (such as "WBND-LD" and "W25AA-D"), occasionally no suffix (uses same call sign as main transmitter). Some stations briefly used -DL as well (this has since become obsolete). Some full-powered stations (such as WOIO, WXMI and WLS-TV) have been granted approval for fill-in translators within their broadcast market to better cover outlying towns or heavily urbanized areas, particularly by stations with a VHF digital signal. These are technically -LD stations, but have the same call-sign as their parent station (such as WLS-TV or WOIO, and not as WLS-LD or WOIO-LD, though they could be considered as such for ease of differentiating the low-power repeater from its parent), similar to a Distributed Transmission System (but on different frequencies).
Digital special temporary authority (STA)	DS	no specific suffix; uses same call sign as station making a request for permission from the FCC to use a channel, power level or transmitter location not permanently allocated for one particular station. Temporary assignments retain, unmodified, the call sign of the corresponding permanent allocation; this includes translator-style calls (a format, such as W55ZZ-D, based on RF channel number plus a sequential identifier) even on those temporarily moving to another frequency.
Digital Television distributed transmission system (multiple transmitter sites)	DD	no specific suffix (uses same call sign as main transmitter); this is usually requested for a single-frequency network and to tailor coverage area to the needs of the viewers in the station's service area (such as covering towns and farmland, and not mountainous terrain or the ocean)
Digital auxiliary (backup) service	DX (not to be confused with DXing)	no specific suffix (uses same call sign as main transmitter)
Digital rulemaking petition	DR	no specific suffix; uses same call sign as station making this request to add or modify a digital channel allocation
Land mobile use of a TV channel (TV RF channels 14-20 only)	LM	As "LM" is used in the FCC database to indicate reallocation of an entire channel, but not to identify individual users transmitting in that spectrum, a 6 MHz LM allocation does not itself carry a TV-style call sign. The spectrum of TV channels 14-20 is called "T-band" in LMR use. Repeaters that operate in such an allocation use a 3 MHz offset instead of 5 MHz as normally used in the 450-470 MHz range.
ATSC 3.0 Futurecast Experimental Broadcasts	EX	Used for officially licensed experimental 4K/2160p Ultra HDTV broadcast stations, such as WRAL-TV's UHDTV simulcast, WRAL-EX.

== See also ==
- Call signs in North America - How call signs and classes are used in North America
- ITU prefix - How callsigns and classes are used worldwide
- Low-power broadcasting
- Class A television service
