= BodyLove =

- Running time: 15 minutes
- Country of origin: United States
- Language: English
- Home station: WJLD
- Starring: Audrey Quinn; Cheryl Hall; James A. McCarty, Jr.
- Created by: Dr. Connie Kohler
- Executive producer: Betsy Hunter
- Recording studio: Boutwell Studios; Birmingham, Alabama
- Original release: 2002 – present
- No. of series: 5
- No. of episodes: 80+
- Website: https://web.archive.org/web/20080707092824/http://www.soph.uab.edu/bodylove/

BodyLove is a radio soap opera in which the characters face common health problems and attempt to deal with them using practical solutions and healthier eating. Billed as "the soap opera that's good for you", BodyLove uses fictional drama to reach African American listeners with messages that promote healthy lifestyles. The program is based upon the principles of "entertainment-education" that have been recommended for reaching audiences not reached by traditional health education and health promotion messages.

The show is aimed at an African American audience which struggles with many of these health problems in disproportionate numbers. (For example, the diabetes death rate for blacks is more than double that for whites.) Betsy Hunter, executive director of the non-profit Media for Health, told The Birmingham News, "If you can't entertain, you can't possibly change health behavior."

== Summary ==
In each weekly 15-minute episode, characters deal with a variety of health problems while trying to navigate personal relationships and deal with strains both financial and emotional. The drama revolves around characters who work and spend their time at a fictitious Birmingham, Alabama, beauty salon called "BodyLove". BodyLove focuses on the family of Vanessa Love, an African American woman in early middle-age who owns the salon and struggles with issues of diet, high blood pressure, weight gain, substance abuse, stress, and death. Vanessa is also raising three children with little help from her husband, a recovering alcoholic. The characters make progress through modest lifestyle changes.

== History ==
BodyLove was created by Dr. Connie Kohler, a public-health professor at the University of Alabama at Birmingham. The show began in 2002 as a single 10-episode series on Birmingham station WJLD (1400 AM). It quickly expanded in scope and affiliate coverage to a multi-year saga heard in all of Alabama's population centers.

The first 80 episodes of BodyLove aired across the state of Alabama in four 20-episode seasons between 2003 and 2007. After a fundraising break, Kohler and her partners resumed writing and producing new episodes, which began airing in late 2008 after local stations cycled through reruns of the earlier seasons. The show's episodes were written by UAB faculty and UAB students in screen-writing classes taught by Lee Shackleford.

BodyLove is currently a project of Media for Health and the UAB School of Public Health. Media for Health is a private non-profit organization formed in September 2006 to produce, promote, and distribute BodyLove. Funding for BodyLove is provided by local and national charitable foundations, in partnership with the Robert Wood Johnson Foundation's Local Initiative Funding Partners Program.

== Presentation ==
On most affiliate stations, each episode is followed by a 45-minute talk period where listeners may speak to local health experts and get information about local health resources. For example, on WJUS in Marion, Alabama, the program is hosted locally by registered nurse Frances Ford who bookends the show with a listener call-in show offering advice, support, and "practical steps to better health". Since nearly one-third of Perry County residents live in poverty, Ford tailors her on-air nutrition tips to suit local budgets. On WJJN in Dothan, Alabama, the call-in program following each episode is hosted by Dr. Harriett Searcy, medical director at the Alfred Saliba Family Services Center's Family Health Clinic. On Birmingham station WJLD (1400 AM), hosts included Dr. Pamela Plummer, Jann Robinson and Benita Wrenn. Wrenn was also a part of the Bodylove Writer's Group.

== Affiliates ==
Stations in Alabama that have broadcast BodyLove include WEUP-FM and WEUV in Huntsville, WHBB in Selma, WHIY in Moulton, WJDB in Thomasville, WJJN in Dothan, WJLD in Birmingham, WJUS in Marion, WMFC in Monroeville, WRJX in Jackson, WSYA in Anniston, WTLS in Tallassee, WTSK in Tuscaloosa, WVAS in Montgomery, and WZZA in Tuscumbia. The show is also carried by stations in Atlanta, Georgia, Jackson, Mississippi, and Port St. Lucie, Florida.

Off the air, the episodes can be streamed online from the website of WBHJ in Birmingham, Alabama.

== Cast ==
The cast, which includes professional and amateur actors, performs under the direction of the chairman of the University of Alabama at Birmingham's theater department. Listed alphabetically by character name:

- Fadelia ... Cheryl Hall
- Kevron ... James Whitson II
- Mabel ... Tena Wilson
- Maya ... Chalethia Williams
- Miles ... Rick Lewis
- Moe ... Ken Talley
- Patricia Higgins ... Donna Marbury
- Rev. Higgins ... Quinton Cockrell (year 1) / Michael Reed (year 2 and after)
- Rosalyn ... Vanessa Anderson
- Saul ... James A. McCarty Jr.
- Sonny ... LaWayne Childrey
- TJ ... Tory Malavet
- Vanessa Love ... Audrey Quinn
- Dr. Jemmand ... Benita Wrenn

== The future ==
Kohler and her partners are working on new episodes of BodyLove, as well as an upcoming three-minute show focusing on obesity. That series is set to air on radio stations in urban areas with large African American populations and will be funded in part by the National Institutes of Health.
