= Urs Amann =

Swiss surrealist painter (1951–2019)

Urs Amann (25 May 1951 – 7 May 2019) was a Swiss surrealist painter. He is mostly known as the painter of the cover art for several Klaus Schulze records, all in a style reminiscent of Salvador Dalí. He also illustrated the covers of many books, including some by his brother, Jürg Amann. Urs Amann liked to qualify his work as "meta-realistic painting".

== Biography ==
Urs Amman was born 1951 in Winterthur. During 1971, in Berlin, he produced his first oil paintings. In 1972, he attended the Form+Farbe Art School in Zurich. In 1974, he began his career as a freelance artist, and since 1980, he has been a member of the Winterthur artists group.

== Cover art ==
Note: some records (Irrlicht, Cyborg, and Picture Music) have been published several times under various covers from other artists.

Klaus Schulze

- Irrlicht (1972)
- Cyborg (1973)
- Blackdance (1974)
- Picture Music (1975)
- Timewind (1975)

Adelbert Von Deyen

- Atmosphere (1980)

Wolfgang Bock

- Cycles (1980)
