= Body Love =

Body Love may refer to:

== Music ==
- Body Love (album), a 1977 album by Klaus Schulze
- Body Love Vol. 2, another 1977 album by Klaus Schulze
- "Body Love" (song), a 2017 song by IDER

== Radio ==
- BodyLove, a health-oriented radio soap opera
