= Picture Music =

- 1975 Isadora/Clementine Records cover

Studio album by Klaus Schulze
- Released: January 1975
- Recorded: 1974
- Genre: Electronic music, space music
- Length: 46:45 (original); 79:57 (reissue)
- Label: Brain
- Producer: Klaus Schulze

Klaus Schulze chronology
Blackdance (1974)	Picture Music (1975)	Timewind (1975)

Picture Music is the fourth studio album by German musician Klaus Schulze. It was recorded in late 1974 and released in January 1975 on Brain Records. This is the only Klaus Schulze solo album in which he can be heard playing a drum kit. Prior to his solo career, he was the drummer for Ash Ra Tempel; on his later albums, he would collaborate with other drummers including Harald Grosskopf of Wallenstein or use drum machines. Like many of his albums, Picture Music has one long track on each side.

For many years, various Schulze discographies have listed Picture Music as being his third, with Blackdance being his fourth. However, when preparing a detailed discography in the 1990s, Schulze's biographer and publicity manager Klaus D. Müller researched his personal diaries and discovered that the album did not go to press until early 1975. The album is now identified as a January 1975 release at Schulze's website, which Müller maintains.

In 2005 this was the second Schulze album reissued by Revisited Records.

== Cover art and variations ==
Picture Music in its various editions, has more cover art designs than any other Klaus Schulze album, and another reason for confusion of release order of albums lies in the choice of original cover artist. The original cover was an abstract painting by Jacques Wyrs. Schulze's previous album, Blackdance, featured a painting by Urs Amann, and in 1975, Schulze commissioned Amann to make new covers for his previous albums, Irrlicht and Cyborg, as well as his next, Timewind. Schulze did commission an Amann cover for Picture Music as well (as pictured above, showing a man bound to a ceiling), probably after the first edition of the album was released, but Brain Records did not want to pay the expense of having a new cover designed, and rejected it. However, the Amann cover was used on a French edition on Isadora / Clementine Records (Isadora being the name on the cover, but Clementine was the name on the label).

Other issues of Picture Music have used other covers. A 1970s release in Belgium on Ariola Records uses a cover portrait of Schulze, framed to match the cover of a later album, Moondawn. In around 1980, Brain Records issued a series of budget reissues, with new cover art designed "in house" to keep costs down by not paying royalties on previous cover art, showing a framed portrait of a child, balanced upright on one corner in a barren field. In 1985, Gramavision Records in the U.S. reissued several titles from Schulze's back catalogue with new covers showing printed circuit boards superimposed over photographs of landscapes (again, an anonymous "in house" design). The 2005 CD reissue with bonus track uses the Amann cover with his original back cover design that had never appeared before (the French album with that cover had used a blown-up detail from the front cover for the back), and also reproduced previous covers inside the CD booklet.

== Track listing ==
All tracks are written by Klaus Schulze

Side one
No.	Title	Length
1.	"Totem"	23:53

Side two
No.	Title	Length
1.	"Mental Door"	23:02

2005 Revisited Records bonus track
No.	Title	Note	Length
3.	"C'est pas la même chose"	alternate version of "Totem"	33:00

On the French LP edition on Clementine Records, side two plays first in error. "Mental Door" is the track with drums.

== Personnel ==
- Klaus Schulze – EMS VCS 3 synthesizer, ARP Odyssey synthesizer, ARP 2600 synthesizer, Farfisa Professional Duo organ, drums, percussion
