= WJDB =

WJDB may refer to:

- WJDB-FM, a radio station (95.5 FM) licensed to Thomasville, Alabama, United States
- WJDB (AM), a defunct radio station (630 AM) formerly licensed to Thomasville, Alabama, United States
