= WEUP =

WEUP could refer to:

- WEUP (AM), a radio station (1700 AM) licensed to Huntsville, Alabama, United States
- WEUP-FM, a radio station (103.1 FM) licensed to Moulton, Alabama, United States
