= WMFC =

WMFC may refer to:

- WMFC (AM), a defunct radio station (1360 AM) licensed to serve Monroeville, Alabama, United States, from 1952 to 2010
- WMFC (FM), a radio station (99.3 FM) licensed to serve Monroeville, from 1965 to the present
- World Medical Football Championship, an annual football (soccer) tournament of physician professionals
- World Medieval Fighting Championship
