= Alabama State Route 99 =

State highway in Alabama, United States

State Route 99

Route information
- Maintained by ALDOT
- Length: 21.914 mi (35.267 km)

Major junctions
- South end: US 31 in Athens
- North end: SR 207 near Anderson

Location
- Country: United States
- State: Alabama
- Counties: Limestone, Lauderdale

Highway system
- Alabama State Highway System; Interstate; US; State
← US 98	→ SR 100

State Route 99 (SR 99) is a 21.914-mile-long (35.267 km) state highway that extends from Athens in Limestone County to just northeast of Anderson in Lauderdale County. Although it is signed as a north–south highway, most of its route is in an east–west direction.

== Route description ==
The southern terminus of SR 99 is located at an intersection with U.S. Route 31 (US 31) in northeast Athens. From this point, the highway travels concurrently with Elm Street in a westerly direction through the city. As it exits the city limits, SR 99 changes routes, becoming an extension of Market Street before heading in a northwesterly trajectory towards Mount Rozell. From there, it then travels in a westerly direction before terminating at SR 207 northeast of Anderson.

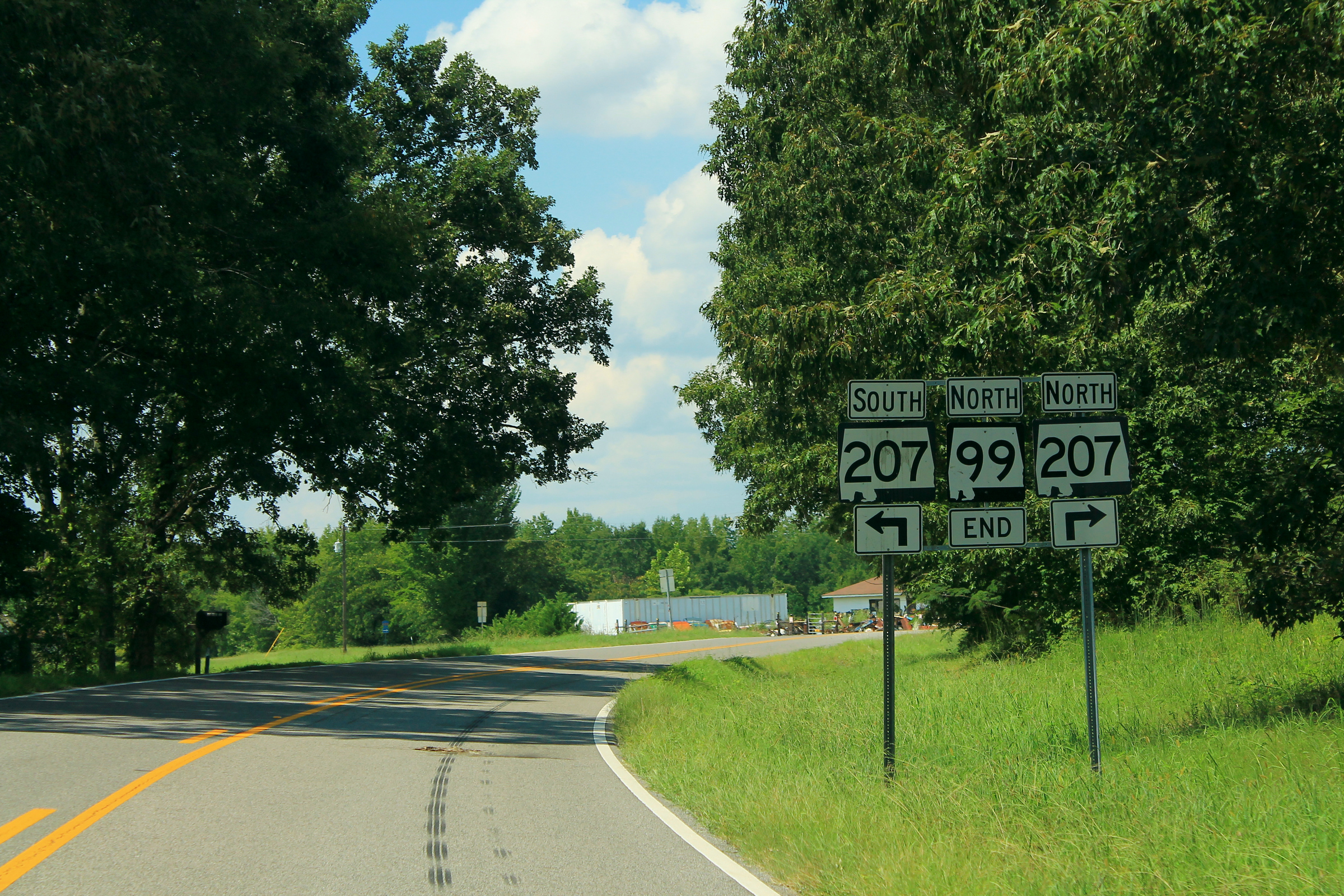
Northern terminus

== Major intersections ==
County	Location	mi	km	Destinations	Notes
Limestone	Athens	0.000	0.000	US 31 (SR 3) to I-65	Southern terminus
Limestone	Athens	1.551	2.496	SR 127 north	Southern terminus of SR 127
Lauderdale		21.914	35.267	SR 207	Northern terminus
1.000 mi = 1.609 km; 1.000 km = 0.621 mi
