= WTBC (AM) =

- Tuscaloosa, Alabama; United States
- Frequency: 1230 kHz
- Branding: Tide 100.9

Programming
- Format: Sports
- Affiliations: Fox Sports Radio

Ownership
- Owner: Townsquare Media; (Townsquare License, LLC)
- Sister stations: WFFN; WQRR; WALJ; WTSK; WTUG-FM

History
- First air date: 1946
- Former call signs: WRRX (1987–1989); WRLX (1989–1991); WTNW (1991–1997)
- Call sign meaning: Tuscaloosa Broadcasting Company

Technical information
- Licensing authority: FCC
- Facility ID: 731
- Class: C
- Power: 1,000 watts
- Transmitter coordinates: 33°13′9.43″N 87°30′31.02″W
- Translator: 100.9 W265CG (Tuscaloosa)

Links
- Public license information: Public file; LMS
- Webcast: Listen live
- Website: tide1009.com

WTBC (1230 AM) is a radio station broadcasting a sports radio format. Licensed to Tuscaloosa, Alabama, United States, the station serves the greater Tuscaloosa area. The station is owned by Townsquare Media. It was also the first media position that James Spann ever had in the media.

In May 2016, it was announced that Townsquare Media would be buying WTBC and sister station WNPT-FM (now WFMA) for $550,000. (Alabama Broadcast Media Page) According to published reports, WNPT-FM would go sports and WTBC would retain the Catfish Country format, once the new owners take over. Townsquare Media's purchase of the stations was consummated on July 15, 2016.

As of this update, Catfish Country is now being heard exclusively on WTBC and translator W261BT, branded as Catfish 100.1.

Under the ownership of Townsquare Media, WTBC provides regular weather coverage from WVUA in Tuscaloosa, under the direction of their Chief Meteorologist Richard Scott.

During times of active severe, tropical, and Winter weather events, WTBC provides West Alabama's only live and local weather coverage on the radio, with local, in house, Staff Meteorologist Bobby Best.

Additionally, under the ownership of Townsquare Media and the direction of Market President/Chief Revenue Officer David R. Dubose, WTBC also provides West Alabama radio's only live and local news coverage with News Director Don Hartley and West, Alabama's only live and local traffic coverage with Traffic Reporter Capt'n Ray.

On October 12, 2023, WTBC changed its format from classic country (which moved to WTUG-FM HD2) to sports, branded as "Tide 100.9" and switched translators to W265CG 100.9 FM Tuscaloosa.

== Translator ==
Broadcast translator for WTBC
Call sign	Frequency	City of license	FID	ERP (W)	HAAT	Class	Transmitter coordinates	FCC info
W265CG	100.9 FM	Tuscaloosa, Alabama	148566	250	0 m (0 ft)	D	33°9′36.4″N 87°30′54″W	LMS
