= Wajo =

Wajo may refer to:

- Wajo Regency, a regency of South Sulawesi province of Indonesia.
- Wajo Kingdom, an elective monarchy founded in the fifteenth century in the south of Sulawesi.
- A Japanese terminology (和城) for Japanese castle.
- WJUS, a radio station (1310 AM) in Marion, Alabama, United States, known as WAJO from 1983 to 1998
