= WEUZ =

- Minor Hill, Tennessee; United States
- Broadcast area: Huntsville, Alabama
- Frequency: 92.1 MHz
- Branding: 103.1 WEUP

Programming
- Format: Urban Contemporary (WEUP-FM simulcast)

Ownership
- Owner: Broadcast One; (Hundley Batts, Sr. & Virginia Caples)
- Sister stations: WEUP (AM), WEUP-FM, WEUV, WHIY

History
- First air date: 1987
- Former call signs: WLLX, WYBM, WEUP-FM
- Call sign meaning: a variation of WEUP

Technical information
- Licensing authority: FCC
- Facility ID: 7053
- Class: A
- ERP: 2,600 watts
- HAAT: 146 meters (479 feet)
- Transmitter coordinates: 35°07′18″N 87°11′17″W
- Translator: (see below)

Links
- Public license information: Public file; LMS
- Webcast: Listen Live
- Website: www.103weup.com

WEUZ (92.1 FM) is an urban contemporary format radio station that serves north Alabama and south-central Tennessee, United States. Its programming is a simulcast of co-owned WEUP-FM. This programming is also simulcast on several broadcast translators. The station's studios are located along Jordan Lane (U.S. Highway 231) in Northwest Huntsville, and its transmitter is located west of Goodspring, Tennessee.

This station was assigned the WEUZ call letters by the Federal Communications Commission on April 6, 2000.

== Ownership ==
In 1987, a married couple, Hundley Batts, Sr. and Dr. Virginia Caples, acquired WXKI (92.1 FM, now WEUZ-FM), licensed to Minor Hill, Tennessee, (just north of the Alabama border). This followed their assumption of the ownership and operation of WEUP (AM). They combined these operations and brought WEUP onto the FM broadcast airwaves.

They operated WEUP and WEUZ-FM under the parent company name of Broadcast One. They continued to expand the station's audience by acquiring WHIY (1190 AM, now WEUV) and WXKI (103.1 FM, now WEUP-FM), both licensed to Moulton, Alabama, in 1989. The stations were sold to Hundley Batts and Virginia Caples as part of a two-station deal by Moulton Broadcasting Co. Inc. (WHIY) and Lawco FM Ltd. (WXKI). WEUV (1700 AM, now WEUP (AM)) was later added to the group of stations that are part of the WEUP broadcast family.

== Translators ==
Call sign	Frequency	City of license	FID	ERP (W)	Class	FCC info
W275AA	102.9 FM	Huntsville, Alabama	17349	10	D	LMS
W238AD	95.5 FM	Trinity, Alabama	53467	13	D	LMS
