= WALJ =

- Northport, Alabama; United States
- Broadcast area: Tuscaloosa, Alabama
- Frequency: 105.1 MHz
- Branding: 105.1 The Block

Programming
- Format: Urban contemporary
- Affiliations: Compass Media Networks

Ownership
- Owner: Townsquare Media; (Townsquare License, LLC)
- Sister stations: WFFN, WQRR, WTUG-FM, WTBC, WTSK

History
- First air date: September 26, 2011

Technical information
- Licensing authority: FCC
- Facility ID: 189495
- Class: A
- ERP: 2,600 watts
- HAAT: 154.1 meters (506 ft)
- Transmitter coordinates: 33°12′29″N 87°43′10″W

Links
- Public license information: Public file; LMS
- Webcast: Listen Live
- Website: 1051theblock.com

WALJ (105.1 FM) is an American radio station which has applied to be licensed to serve Northport, Alabama, United States. The station is owned by Townsquare Media and serves the Tuscaloosa, Alabama, area.

== History ==
In June 2011, Apex Broadcasting applied to the Federal Communications Commission (FCC) for a construction permit for a new broadcast radio station. The FCC granted this permit on July 19, 2011, with a scheduled expiration date of July 19, 2014. The new station was assigned call sign WALJ on July 27, 2011.

On September 26, 2011, WALJ signed on the air with a mainstream urban radio format, branded as "105.1 Jamz". The FCC has accepted the station's formal license application and WALJ is operating under program test authority.

On July 20, 2012, Cox Radio, Inc. announced that the programming rights of WALJ would be turned over to SummitMedia for $66.25 million as part of a 22-station sale. The transfer/sale was consummated on May 3, 2013.

On June 5, 2019, Townsquare Media announced that it would acquire WALJ. To comply with FCC ownership rules, Townsquare would sell WTID to Educational Media Foundation. Upon closing of the sale on August 1, 2019, the station would rebrand as "105.1 The Block". WALJ began carrying the Rickey Smiley Morning Show in mornings and, with the rebrand, brought in former WGPR and WQNC midday host Ally 'Ally The Pub’ Washington for afternoons under the on-air name of ‘Ally Lynn’.
