= WFMA =

WFMA may refer to:

- WFMA (FM), an American radio station
- WFMA-LP, a defunct low-powered television station
- World Folk Music Association (WFMA), a non-profit organization
