= WMHZ =

WMHZ may refer to:

- WMHZ (AM), a radio station (1340 AM) licensed to serve Holt, Alabama, United States
- WRJE, a radio station (1600 AM) licensed to serve Dover, Delaware, United States, which held the call sign WMHZ from April to September 2011
