= WBEI =

WBEI may refer to:

- WBEI-LP, a low-power radio station (102.9 FM) licensed to serve Charleston, South Carolina, United States
- WQRR, a radio station (101.7 FM) licensed to serve Reform, Alabama, United States, which held the call sign WBEI from 2003 to 2018
- Warner Bros. Entertainment Inc., American multinational film and entertainment company
