= WHIY =

Huntsville, Alabama; United States
- Broadcast area: Tennessee Valley
- Frequency: 1600 kHz

Programming
- Format: Urban oldies and Blues

Ownership
- Owner: Broadcast One; (Hundley Batts, Sr. & Virginia Caples)
- Sister stations: WEUP, WEUP-FM, WEUV, WEUZ

History
- First air date: March 20, 1958
- Former call signs: WEUP (1958–2006); WEUV (2006)

Technical information
- Licensing authority: FCC
- Facility ID: 28118
- Class: B
- Power: 5,000 watts (day); 500 watts (night)
- Transmitter coordinates: 34°45′32″N 86°38′35″W

Links
- Public license information: Public file; LMS
- Website: whiyam.com

WHIY (1600 AM) is a commercial radio station licensed to Huntsville, Alabama, United States, and serves the majority of the Tennessee Valley in north Alabama with an Urban oldies and Blues format. The station's studios and transmitter are both co-located along Jordan Lane (U.S. Highway 53) in Northwest Huntsville.

== History ==
WHIY began broadcasting, as WEUP, on March 20, 1958, on a 1000-watt 1600 kilohertz (kHz) AM transmitter. This transmitter was built by the Brennan/Benns group while building WVOK, WAPE, and WBAM. The station was owned by Leroy and Viola Garrett, who became the first African-American owners of a radio station in the state of Alabama. WEUP first broadcast from a pink trailer in the grounds of Syler Tabernacle Church in Huntsville, before moving to studios on Jordan Lane. The station's format was a mixture of gospel music, sermons, news, and R&B, everyday from sunrise to 6 p.m.

Listeners of 1600 AM were able to hear a viable mix of gospel and soul music as well as news and public affairs catering to the interests of the Tennessee Valley's black population.

The Garretts made history when they testified before a congressional committee in 1963, the outcome of which resulted in the change of a Federal Communications Commission (FCC) law regulating 24-hour broadcasts in the 1960s. That same year WEUP began 24-hour broadcasts, yet another milestone for urban radio.

The station celebrated its 50th anniversary by hosting a Blues Festival on August 16, 2008, at Kalea Park in Meridianville, Alabama. The festival featured national, regional, and local blues artists performing live.

Viola Garrett decided to sell the station in 1987 after the death of her husband, Leroy. Later that year, Hundley Batts Sr. and Dr. Virginia Caples, another married couple, assumed the ownership and operation of WEUP. They also acquired another station, WEUZ-FM (92.1 FM), licensed to Minor Hill, Tennessee, (just north of the Alabama border) and brought WEUP onto the FM broadcast airwaves.

They operated WEUP and WEUZ-FM under the parent company name of Broadcast One. They continued to expand the station's audience by acquiring WHIY (then at 1190 AM) and WXKI (103.1 FM, now WEUP-FM), both licensed to Moulton in 1989.

In the 1980s, the station aired a country music format. In August 1987, WEUP co-founder Viola Garrett's Garrett Broadcasting reached an agreement to sell WEUP to the married couple of Hundley Batts, Sr. and Dr. Virginia Caples. The deal was approved by the FCC on September 29, 1987, and the transaction was consummated on November 1, 1987. The couple also acquired WEUZ-FM (92.1 FM), licensed to Minor Hill, Tennessee, and brought WEUP onto the FM broadcast airwaves. They operated WEUP and WEUZ-FM under the parent company name of Broadcast One. They continued to expand the station's audience by acquiring WHIY (1190 AM) and WEUP-FM (103.1), both licensed to Moulton, Alabama, in 1989

=== Expanded Band assignment ===
On March 17, 1997 the FCC announced that eighty-eight stations had been given permission to move to newly available "Expanded Band" transmitting frequencies, ranging from 1610 to 1700 kHz, with WEUP authorized to move from 1600 to 1700 kHz.

A Construction Permit for the expanded band station was assigned the call letters WEUV on August 7, 2000. The FCC's initial policy was that both the original station and its expanded band counterpart could operate simultaneously for up to five years, after which owners would have to turn in one of the two licenses, depending on whether they preferred the new assignment or elected to remain on the original frequency. However, this deadline has been extended multiple times, and both stations have remained authorized. One restriction is that the FCC has generally required paired original and expanded band stations to remain under common ownership.

=== Later history ===
In early 2006 there was a call letter swap between co-owned 1600 AM and 1700 AM, with 1600 AM becoming WEUV, and 1700 AM inheriting the historic WEUP call letters. A few weeks later the call letters for AM 1600 were changed to WHIY, a call sign that had previously had been on co-owned 1190 AM.

For most of the 2000s, WHIY's programming was a simulcast of sister station WEUV on 1700 AM. WHIY returned to independent programming in December 2007.

== Awards ==
In November 2007, WEUP owner Hundley Batts was recognized as one of five 2008 Northern Alabama Business Hall of Fame Laureates by Junior Achievement of Northern Alabama. Batts was honored as a civic leader and for his contributions to free enterprise and the community.
