= WEUV =

- Moulton, Alabama; United States
- Broadcast area: Huntsville, Alabama
- Frequency: 1190 kHz

Programming
- Format: Urban Contemporary Gospel and Urban Adult Contemporary (WEUP simulcast)

Ownership
- Owner: Broadcast One; (Hundley Batts, Sr. & Virginia Caples)
- Sister stations: WEUP, WEUP-FM, WEUZ, WHIY

History
- First air date: July 14, 1981
- Former call signs: WHIY

Technical information
- Licensing authority: FCC
- Facility ID: 43896
- Class: D
- Power: 2,500 watts day
- Transmitter coordinates: 34°28′55″N 87°18′04″W

Links
- Public license information: Public file; LMS
- Webcast: Listen Live
- Website: www.weupam.com

WEUV (1190 AM) is an urban contemporary gospel and urban adult contemporary formatted radio station licensed to Moulton, Alabama, that serves Huntsville, Alabama, and northwest Alabama, United States. The station's studios are located along Jordan Lane (U.S. Highway 231) in Northwest Huntsville, and its transmitter is located in Moulton.

Its programming is a simulcast of sister station WEUP (1700 AM). The WEUV call letters were on the 1700 AM signal until a 2006 re-alignment with co-owned WHIY (originally 1190 AM) and WEUP (originally 1600 AM).

This station was assigned the WEUV call letters by the Federal Communications Commission on February 23, 2000.

== Ownership ==
In 1987, the married couple of Hundley Batts, Sr. and Dr. Virginia Caples assumed the ownership and operation of WEUP. They also acquired another station, WEUZ (92.1 FM), licensed to Minor Hill, Tennessee, and brought WEUP onto the FM broadcast airwaves. They operated WEUP & WEUZ-FM under the parent company name of Broadcast One. They continued to expand the station's audience by acquiring WHIY (1190 AM) and WEUP-FM (103.1), both licensed to Moulton, Alabama, in 1989. The stations were sold to Hundley Batts and Virginia Caples as part of a two-station deal by Moulton Broadcasting Co. Inc. (then WHIY, now WEUV) and Lawco FM Ltd. (then WXKI, now WEUP-FM). WEUV (1700 AM) was later added to the group of stations that are part of the WEUP broadcast family.
