= Timewind =

Studio album by Klaus Schulze
- Released: August 1975
- Recorded: March, June 1975
- Genre: Electronic music, space music, Berlin School
- Length: 59:13 (original); 115:27 (reissue)
- Label: Brain Records, Virgin Records
- Producer: Klaus Schulze

Klaus Schulze chronology
Picture Music (1975)	Timewind (1975)	Moondawn (1976)

Professional ratings
Review scores
Source	Rating
AllMusic	4/5 stars

Timewind is the fifth album by Klaus Schulze. It was originally released in 1975, and is Schulze's first solo album to use a sequencer, something which would become a mainstay of nearly all of his work going forward. It features cover art by Urs Amann, who also provided artwork for several other Schulze albums.

Timewind was awarded the Grand Prix du Disque of L'Académie Charles Cros in 1976, and in 2006 it was the twenty-second Schulze album reissued by Revisited Records, with an extra disc of bonus material.

== Overview ==
Like many of his other albums, Timewind contains only two songs, each taking up an entire side of a vinyl record. Both track titles are references to the nineteenth-century composer Richard Wagner. Bayreuth is the Bavarian town where Wagner had an opera house built for the first performance of his massive Ring Cycle. Wahnfried is the name of Wagner's home in Bayreuth in the grounds of which he was buried in 1883. "Wahnfried" is also a name used by Schulze himself for several albums.

Compositionally, the album represents somewhat of a turning point for Schulze, marking the start of his foray into what would later be termed the Berlin school of electronic music, or simply Berlin School.

"Bayreuth Return" was recorded on two-track equipment in one take, and is essentially "live in the studio". Its rhythmic basis is a single analog sequencer pattern, transposed and manipulated in real time. String synthesizer chords, improvised melodies, and complex sound effects are the remaining elements. "Wahnfried 1883", in contrast, is a slow piece that was composed and multitracked. Its main building blocks are layers of slow, shimmering pads and lines. The kaleidoscopic key changes without obvious 'home key' may be seen as a musical nod to Wagner. An excerpt of the graphic performance score of "Wahnfried 1883" appears on the back sleeve of the original vinyl version.

The deluxe edition bonus track "Echoes of Time" is a longer alternate take of "Bayreuth Return", while "Windy Times" was recorded in 2000 and previously appeared on Contemporary Works I.

== Track listing ==
All tracks are written by Klaus Schulze.

Side one
No.	Title	Length
1.	"Bayreuth Return"	30:32

Side two
No.	Title	Length
2.	"Wahnfried 1883"	28:38

2006 Revisited Records bonus tracks
No.	Title	Note	Length
1.	"Echoes of Time"	alternate version of "Bayreuth Return"	38:42
2.	"Solar Wind"		12:35
3.	"Windy Times"	Recorded 2000; previously issued on Contemporary Works I	4:57

== Personnel ==
- Klaus Schulze – ARP 2600, ARP Odyssey, EMS Synthi A, Elka String Synthesizer, Farfisa Professional Duo Organ and Piano, Synthanorma Sequencer.
- Urs Amann - cover art
