= Alabama State Route 207 =

State highway in Alabama, United States

State Route 207

Route information
- Maintained by ALDOT
- Length: 13.959 mi (22.465 km)

Major junctions
- South end: US 72 in Rogersville
- North end: SR 11 at the Tennessee state line near Minor Hill, TN

Location
- Country: United States
- State: Alabama
- Counties: Lauderdale

Highway system
- Alabama State Highway System; Interstate; US; State
← SR 205	→ SR 208

State Route 207 (SR 207) is a 13.959-mile-long (22.465 km) route that serves as a connection between U.S. Route 72 (US 72) in Rogersville in Lauderdale County and the Tennessee state line. After crossing the state line, it becomes Tennessee State Route 11 (SR 11).

== Route description ==
The southern terminus of SR 207 is located at its intersection with US 72 opposite CR 91 in southern Rogersville. From this point, the route travels in a northerly direction towards Anderson. From Anderson, the route turns to the northeast before resuming a more northerly track after its junction with SR 99 as it enters Tennessee.

== Major intersections ==
The entire route is in Lauderdale County.

Location	mi	km	Destinations	Notes
Rogersville	0.0	0.0	US 72 (SR 2) – Killen, Athens	Southern terminus
Anderson	9.279	14.933	SR 99 south – Athens	Northern terminus of SR 99
	12.309	19.809	SR 64 west – Lexington	Eastern terminus of SR 64
	13.959	22.465	SR 11 north (Minor Hill Highway) – Minor Hill	Northern terminus; Tennessee state line; continues as SR 11
1.000 mi = 1.609 km; 1.000 km = 0.621 mi
