= WTUG-FM =

Radio station in Tuscaloosa, Alabama

- Northport, Alabama; United States
- Broadcast area: Tuscaloosa and Vicinity
- Frequency: 92.9 MHz (HD Radio)
- Branding: WTUG 92.9 FM

Programming
- Format: Urban adult contemporary
- Subchannels: HD2: Catfish 100.1 (Classic country); HD3: 97.5 El Jefe (Spanish adult hits); HD4: WMHZ simulcast (Classic rock)
- Affiliations: Compass Media Networks; Premiere Networks

Ownership
- Owner: Townsquare Media; (Townsquare License, LLC)
- Sister stations: WFFN; WQRR; WALJ; WTBC; WTSK

History
- First air date: 1979

Technical information
- Licensing authority: FCC
- Facility ID: 54796
- Class: C1
- ERP: 100,000 watts
- HAAT: 298.8 meters (980 ft)
- Transmitter coordinates: 33°03′15″N 87°32′57″W
- Translators: HD2: 100.1 W261BT (Tuscaloosa); HD3: 97.5 W248BO (Tuscaloosa)

Links
- Public license information: Public file; LMS
- Webcast: Listen Live; Listen Live (HD2)
- Website: wtug.com catfishtuscaloosa.com (HD2)

WTUG-FM (92.9 MHz) is a radio station serving the Tuscaloosa, Alabama, vicinity with an urban adult contemporary format. Licensed to Northport, Alabama, United States. The station is currently owned by Townsquare Media.

In February 2005, Apex Broadcasting Inc. (Houston L. Pearce, chairman) reached an agreement to sell WTUG-FM and six other radio stations in Alabama to Citadel Broadcasting (Farid Suleman, chairman/CEO) for a reported sale price of $29 million. Citadel merged with Cumulus Media on September 16, 2011.

Cumulus sold WTUG-FM and its sister stations to Townsquare Media on July 31, 2012.

WTUG-FM provides regular weather coverage from WBMA-LD chief meteorologist James Spann. During times of active severe, tropical, and Winter weather events, WTUG-FM provides West Alabama's only live and local weather coverage on the radio, with local, in-house, Staff Meteorologist Bobby Best.

Additionally, under the ownership of Townsquare Media and the direction of Market President/Chief Revenue Officer David R. Dubose, WTUG-FM also provides West Alabama radio's only live and local news coverage with News Director Don Hartley and West Alabama's only live and local traffic coverage with Traffic Reporter Capt'n Ray.

== HD Radio ==
On December 20, 2017, WTUG-FM's HD3 subchannel flipped from adult album alternative as "Birmingham Mountain Radio" to classic hits as "Nick 97.5", named for University of Alabama coach Nick Saban, with the first song being "Sweet Home Alabama" by Lynyrd Skynyrd. On January 24, 2022, the HD3 subchannel flipped to soft oldies as "97.5 MeTV-FM".

On October 12, 2023, WTUG-FM's HD2 subchannel changed its format from sports (which moved to WTBC 1230 AM Tuscaloosa) to classic country, branded as "Catfish 100.1", switching translators to W261BT 100.1 FM Tuscaloosa.

On January 15, 2025, WTUG-FM's HD3 subchannel changed their format from soft oldies to Spanish adult hits, branded as "97.5 El Jefe" especially to stop the competition with WJRD.

== Translators ==
Broadcast translator for WTUG-HD2
Call sign	Frequency	City of license	FID	ERP (W)	HAAT	Class	Transmitter coordinates	FCC info
W261BT	100.1 FM	Tuscaloosa, Alabama	150872	250	0 m (0 ft)	D	33°9′36″N 87°30′54″W	LMS

Broadcast translator for WTUG-HD3
Call sign	Frequency	City of license	FID	ERP (W)	HAAT	Class	Transmitter coordinates	FCC info
W248BO	97.5 FM	Tuscaloosa, Alabama	150864	52	179.1 m (588 ft)	D	33°9′36″N 87°30′54″W	LMS
