= Hugh P. Harris =

United States Army general (1909–1979)

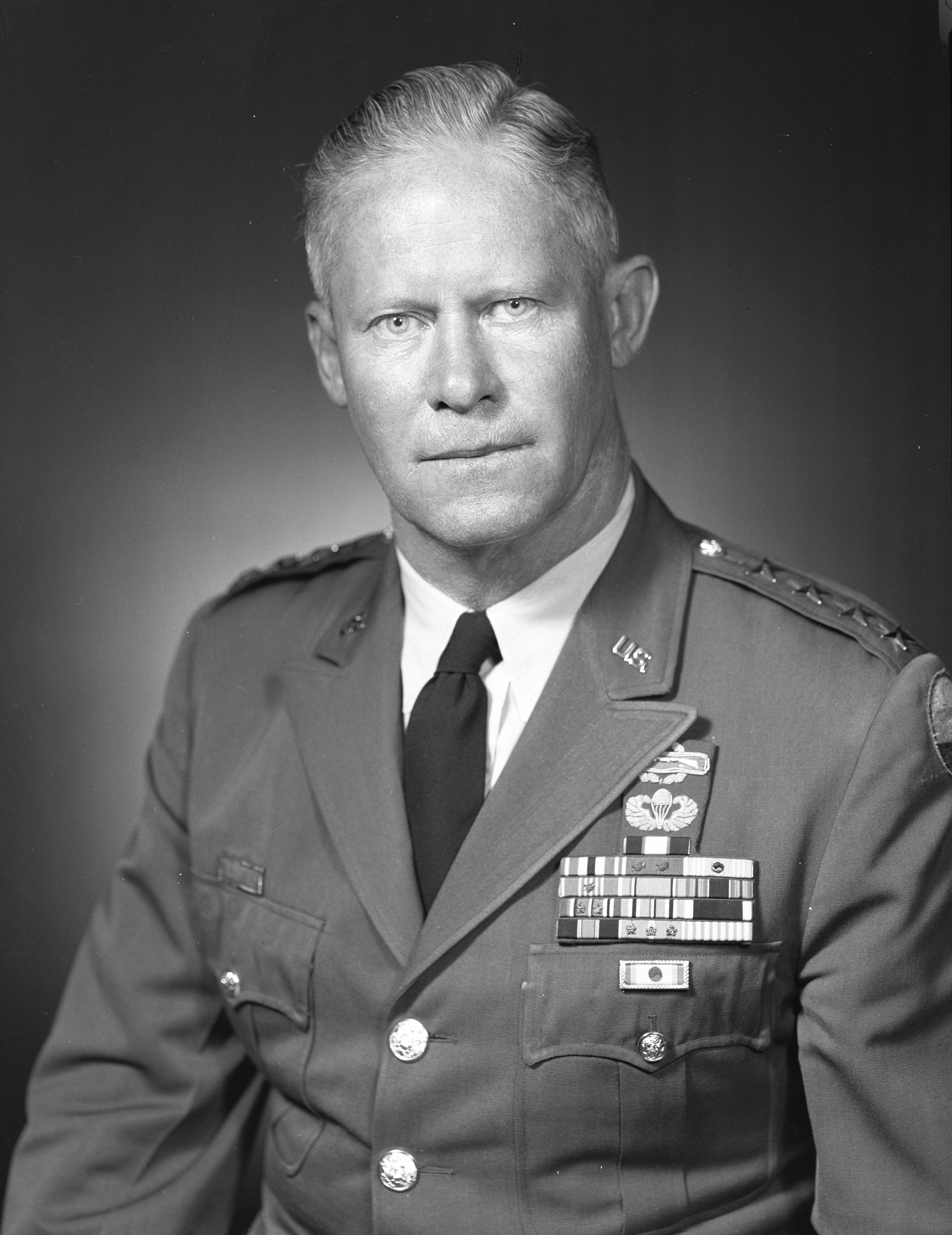
- General Hugh P. Harris
- Born: 15 June 1909; Anderson, Alabama, US
- Died: 3 November 1979 (aged 70); Washington, D.C., US
- Burial place: Arlington National Cemetery
- Military career
- Allegiance: United States
- Branch: United States Army
- Service years: 1931–1965
- Rank: General
- Commands: Continental Army Command; Seventh Army; I Corps; 11th Airborne Division
- Conflicts: World War II; Korean War
- Awards: Silver Star; Legion of Merit
- Other work: President, The Citadel 1965–1970

Hugh Pate Harris (15 June 1909 – 3 November 1979) was a United States Army four-star general who served as Commanding General, U.S. Continental Army Command (CG CONARC) from 1964 to 1965.

== Military career ==
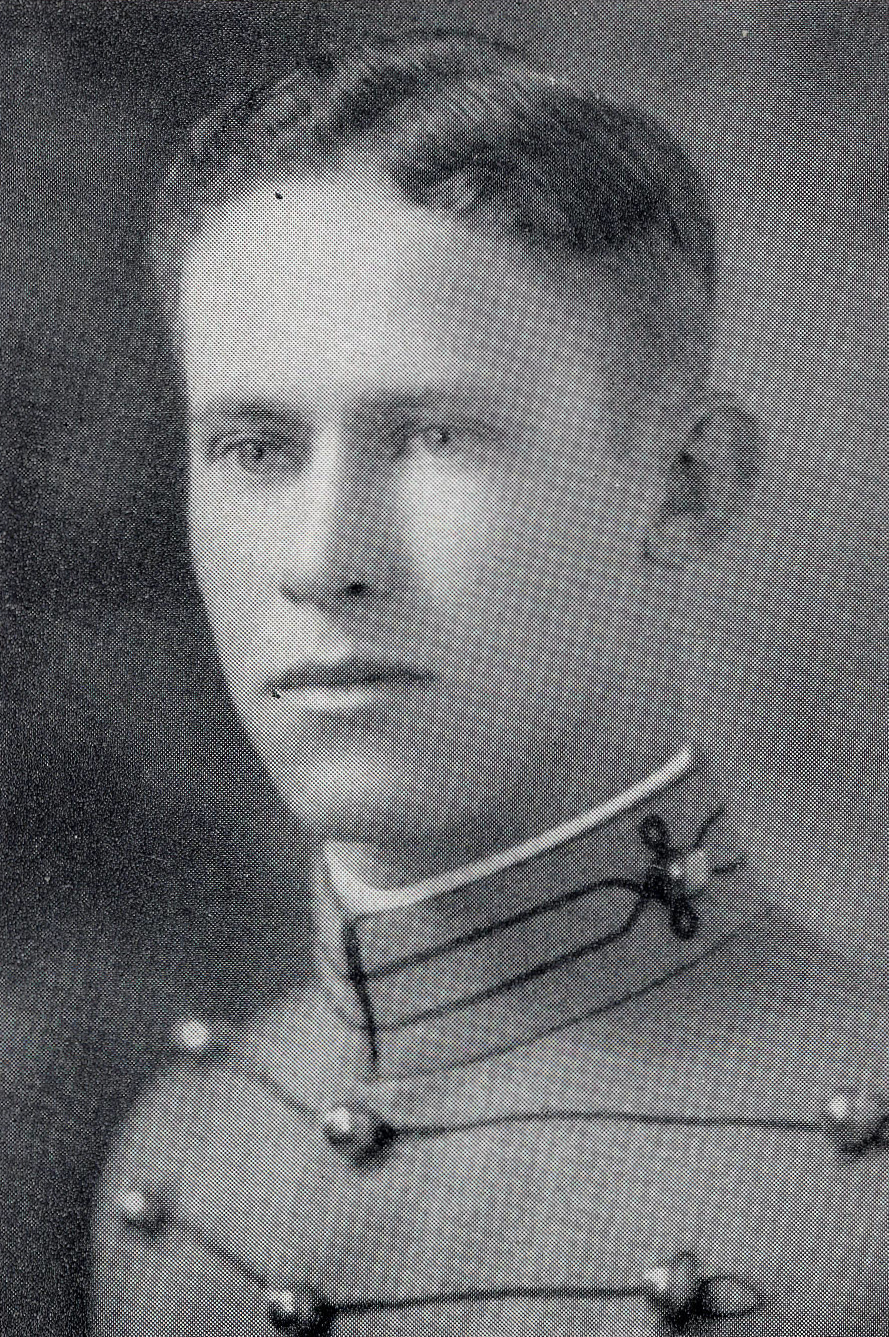
Harris as a United States Military Academy Cadet c. 1931

Harris was born in Anderson, Alabama, on 15 June 1909. After graduating from Columbia Military Academy, he attended and graduated from the United States Military Academy at West Point in 1931, receiving his commission in the infantry.

Early in his career he was involved in the early development of airborne units and doctrine. During World War II he was Chief of Staff of the 13th Airborne Division.

He served as Chief of Staff of the XVIII Airborne Corps, and commanded a regiment in the 40th Infantry Division during the Korean War. After the war he was Deputy Chief of Staff, Eighth United States Army.

He took command of the Berlin Brigade in 1955, and in 1956 assumed command of the 11th Airborne Division. In April 1960, Harris became Commanding General, U.S. Army Infantry Center and Commandant, U.S. Army Infantry School at Fort Benning. In 1961 he was named commander of I Corps, and the next year Commanding General, Seventh United States Army. At retirement in 1965, General Harris was Commanding General of the U.S. Continental Army Command.

Harris' awards and decorations included the Army Distinguished Service Medal, Silver Star, Legion of Merit with two oak leaf clusters, Combat Infantryman Badge, Glider Badge and Airborne Badge.

== Presidency of the Citadel ==
After retiring from the army, Harris became the President of The Citadel, a position he held from 1965 to 1970. He was the third consecutive four star officer to hold that position. During his tenure, Harris "expanded its scope of reach beyond the core of cadets," to establish the "evening undergraduate program in 1966 and its first graduate degrees in 1968 under the name College of Graduate and Professional Studies known today as The Citadel graduate college." <https://www.citadel.edu/citadel-history/wp-content/uploads/sites/77/100-Years-on-the-Ashley-Audio.pdf> Harris also oversaw the enrollment of the Citadel's first African American cadet, Charles DeLesline Foster, who enrolled in 1966.

In 1980 Pat Conroy published the novel "The Lords of Discipline" with a fictional "Carolina Military Institute" mirrored after the Citadel. The novel described a Commanding General who was a highly decorated senior army officer, having served in both the Korean War and World War II, who now oversaw the integration of a lone black cadet in a deeply conservative southern military academy. Unlike Harris, the fictional general in the novel is the power behind an organization called "The Ten" who attempts to run the black cadet out of the school, nearly killing him in the process. Citadel authorities derided Conway's book, in particular his alluding to General Harris, as a fabricated and untrue story. Harris made it publicly known that he did not want "problems for the school" and that Foster was to be treated exactly the same as any other "knob" freshman. As a result, although Foster experienced frequent racial slurs and bigotry, there were no serious incidents and Foster graduated in 1970.

In the words of Maxine Hudson, one of the first women to receive a master's degree from the Citadel, Harris was a "warm" and "approachable and friendly" president who supported students in the master's program. <https://today.citadel.edu/at-91-citadels-first-woman-graduate-celebrates-50th-commencement-anniversary/> At Harris's death, the mayor of Charleston South Carolina, Joseph P. Riley Junior, stated that Harris was "instrumental in establishing new programs for recruiting cadets" and that his leadership "made an indelible imprint upon" the Citadel and the Charleston community. Riley noted Harris was "a military leader, a gifted educator and a true gentleman."

== Death ==
Harris died on 3 November 1979, and was buried in Arlington National Cemetery, next to his first wife, Jane Boyd Harris (1911–1958). His second wife, Lieutenant Colonel Kathleen B. Harris, Ret. (1917–2001), was buried next to him later.
