= WFFN =

Country music radio station in Coaling–Tuscaloosa, Alabama, United States

Coordinates: 33.054°N 87.549°W

- Coaling, Alabama; United States
- Broadcast area: Tuscaloosa, Alabama
- Frequency: 95.3 MHz
- Branding: 95.3 The Bear

Programming
- Format: Country
- Affiliations: Compass Media Networks

Ownership
- Owner: Townsquare Media; (Townsquare License, LLC)
- Sister stations: WQRR, WTBC, WALJ, WTSK, WTUG-FM

History
- First air date: 1987
- Former call signs: WARF-FM (1/1987-4/1987)

Technical information
- Licensing authority: FCC
- Facility ID: 54797
- Class: C2
- ERP: 17,500 watts
- HAAT: 256 meters (840 feet)

Links
- Public license information: Public file; LMS
- Webcast: Listen Live
- Website: 953thebear.com

WFFN (95.3 FM, "95.3 The Bear") is a radio station licensed to serve Coaling, Alabama, United States, and broadcasting to the Tuscaloosa, Alabama, area. The station is owned by Townsquare Media. It broadcasts a country music format. In 2021, it became the home of the long-running, popular "Steve & DC Show". As of 2026, WFFN-FM's Steve & DC is by far the top-rated dominant #1 show in mornings, with the all-important advertiser coveted Adults 18-49 demographic, according to the latest Nielsen Audio report.

The station was assigned the WFFN call sign by the Federal Communications Commission on April 15, 1987. The station changed its city of license from Cordova, Alabama, to Coaling, Alabama, in late 2005.

In June 2004, New Century Radio (Vachel L. Posey Jr., president) reached an agreement to transfer WFFN to Apex Broadcasting Inc. (Houston L. Pearce, chairman) in consideration of the costs to build the facilities related to the then-upcoming change in the community of license. The deal was approved by the FCC on June 24, 2004, and the transaction was consummated on June 30, 2004. At the time of the sale, the station broadcast an oldies music format.

In February 2005, Apex Broadcasting Inc. (Houston L. Pearce, chairman) reached an agreement to sell WFFN and six other radio stations in Alabama to Citadel Broadcasting Company (Farid Suleman, chairman/CEO) for a reported sale price of $29 million. At the time of the sale, the station broadcast an oldies music format. Citadel merged with Cumulus Media on September 16, 2011.

Former logo

Cumulus sold WFFN and its sister stations to Townsquare Media effective July 31, 2012.
