= Body Love Vol. 2 =

Studio album by Klaus Schulze
- Released: December 1977
- Recorded: 1976 & September 1977
- Genre: Electronic music, space music, Berlin School
- Length: 56:23 (original); 79:33 (reissue)
- Label: Brain, Island
- Producer: Klaus Schulze

Klaus Schulze chronology
Mirage (1977)	Body Love Vol. 2 (1977)	X (1978)

Professional ratings
Review scores
Source	Rating
Allmusic	link

Body Love Vol. 2 is the ninth album by Klaus Schulze. It was originally released in December 1977, and in 2007 was the twenty-eighth Schulze album reissued by Revisited Records. It consists of additions to the original soundtrack from February 1977 for the porno film of the same name directed by Lasse Braun. Although generally described with the suffix Vol.2, the album's cover is printed Body Love only and its disk label states Body Love - Additions to the Original Soundtrack. The booklet for the 2007 reissue however maintains the correct title of this album is Body Love 2, as rather than being a second volume of songs from the film, the album consists almost entirely of new compositions in a similar style. The exception is "Stardancer II", which is a remixed version of "Stardancer" from the first Body Love album.

== Track listing ==
All tracks composed by Klaus Schulze.

Side one
No.	Title	Length
1.	"Nowhere – Now Here"	28:55

Side two
No.	Title	Length
1.	"Stardancer II"	14:12
2.	"Moogetique"	13:10

Deluxe edition bonus track
No.	Title	Note	Length
4.	"Buddy Laugh (A Rock'n'Roll Bolero)"	Alternate version of "Nowhere – Now Here"	23:16

== Personnel ==
- Klaus Schulze – electronics
- Harald Grosskopf – drum set
