= Mirage (Klaus Schulze album) =

Studio album by Klaus Schulze
- Released: April 1977
- Recorded: January 1977
- Genre: Electronic music, space music
- Length: 58:11
- Label: Brain, Island
- Producer: Klaus Schulze

Klaus Schulze chronology
Body Love (1977)	Mirage (1977)	Body Love; Vol. 2 (1977)

Professional ratings
Review scores
Source	Rating
Allmusic	4.5/5 stars

Mirage is the eighth album by Klaus Schulze. It was originally released in 1977, and in 2005, was the first Schulze album reissued by Revisited Records. Mirage is subtitled "Eine elektronische Winterlandschaft" ("an electronic winter landscape") and is dedicated to Hans Dieter Schulze.

A slightly different version of "Velvet Voyage" is included on the reissue. An excerpt from "In cosa crede chi non crede?", the bonus track on the reissue, was previously released on Trailer (1999), a compilation CD released to promote the release of Schulze's 50-disc CD box set The Ultimate Edition (2000). In 2017, a newly remastered 40th Anniversary Edition was released.

== Track listing ==
All tracks are written by Klaus Schulze.

Side one
No.	Title	Note	Length
1.	"Velvet Voyage": a. "1984"; b. "Aéronef"; c. "Éclipse"; d. "Exvasion"; e. "Lucidinterspace"; f. "Destinationvoid"	2005 deluxe edition uses different mix than original version	28:16

Side two
No.	Title	Length
2.	"Crystal Lake": a. "Xylotones"; b. "Chrom Waves"; c. "Willowdreams"; d. "Liquidmirrors"; e. "Springdance"; f. "A Bientot"	29:15

Bonus track on 2005 and 2017 remastered editions
No.	Title	Length
3.	"In cosa crede chi non crede?"	19:39

Although separate sections are listed for each track, strict divisions between them are not present within the music.

== Personnel ==
- Klaus Schulze – electronics
