= Mindphaser =

Compilation album by Klaus Schulze
- Released: 1981
- Label: Brain
- Producer: Klaus Schulze

Professional ratings
Review scores
Source	Rating
AllMusic	3/5 stars

Mindphaser is a sampler or "best of" album of songs previously released by Klaus Schulze. It was issued by Brain Records in Germany in 1981, three years after Schulze had moved on and created his own label, Innovative Communications. The second track, "Mindphaser", was actually an excerpt of "Floating" from Moondawn. The other tracks were from LPs which were not made available in the United States for years. The album's cover art and layout copied the style of recent IC releases. As a result, many Americans thought the album was a new solo effort with original material.

== Track listing ==
All tracks are written by Klaus Schulze

No.	Title	Notes	Length
1.	"Some Velvet Phasing"	from Blackdance	8:30
2.	"Mindphaser"	"Floating" excerpt from Moondawn	10:20
3.	"Moogetique"	from Body Love Vol. 2	13:15
4.	"Weird Caravan"	from Dig It	5:20
