= Alabama State Route 100 =

State highway in Alabama, United States

State Route 100

Route information
- Maintained by ALDOT
- Length: 1.670 mi (2.688 km)
- Existed: 1962–present

Major junctions
- West end: US 29 in Andalusia
- East end: US 84 in Andalusia

Location
- Country: United States
- State: Alabama
- Counties: Covington

Highway system
- Alabama State Highway System; Interstate; US; State
← SR 99	→ SR 101

State Route 100 (SR 100) is a 1.67-mile-long (2.69 km) unsigned state highway completely within the city limits of Andalusia in Covington County. The western terminus of the highway is at an intersection with U.S. Route 29 (US 29) in the southwestern part of Andalusia. The eastern terminus of the highway is at an intersection with US 84 in the east-central part of the city.

== Route description ==
State Route 100 (SR 100) begins at an intersection with US 29 in the southwestern part of Andalusia. It proceeds east on two-lane undivided Sanford Road, passing through residential areas and crossing the Three Notch Railroad. The highway continues past more residences before turning northeast into wooded areas, eventually reaching its eastern terminus at an intersection with US 84.

== History ==
SR 100 was designated in 1962 along the route of a southern bypass of Andalusia.

Until 1957, SR 100 was assigned to a road from Elm Bluff to Riley; the southern portion was replaced by the new SR 21, and the remainder was renumbered as SR 89.

== Major intersections ==
The entire route is in Andalusia, Covington County.

mi	km	Destinations	Notes
0.000	0.000	US 29 (East 3 Notch Street/ SR 15)	Western terminus
1.670	2.688	US 84 (M.L. King Jr. Expressway/ SR 12)	Eastern terminus
1.000 mi = 1.609 km; 1.000 km = 0.621 mi
