= Lasse Braun =

Italian pornographer, film director, producer, screenwriter, novelist and researcher

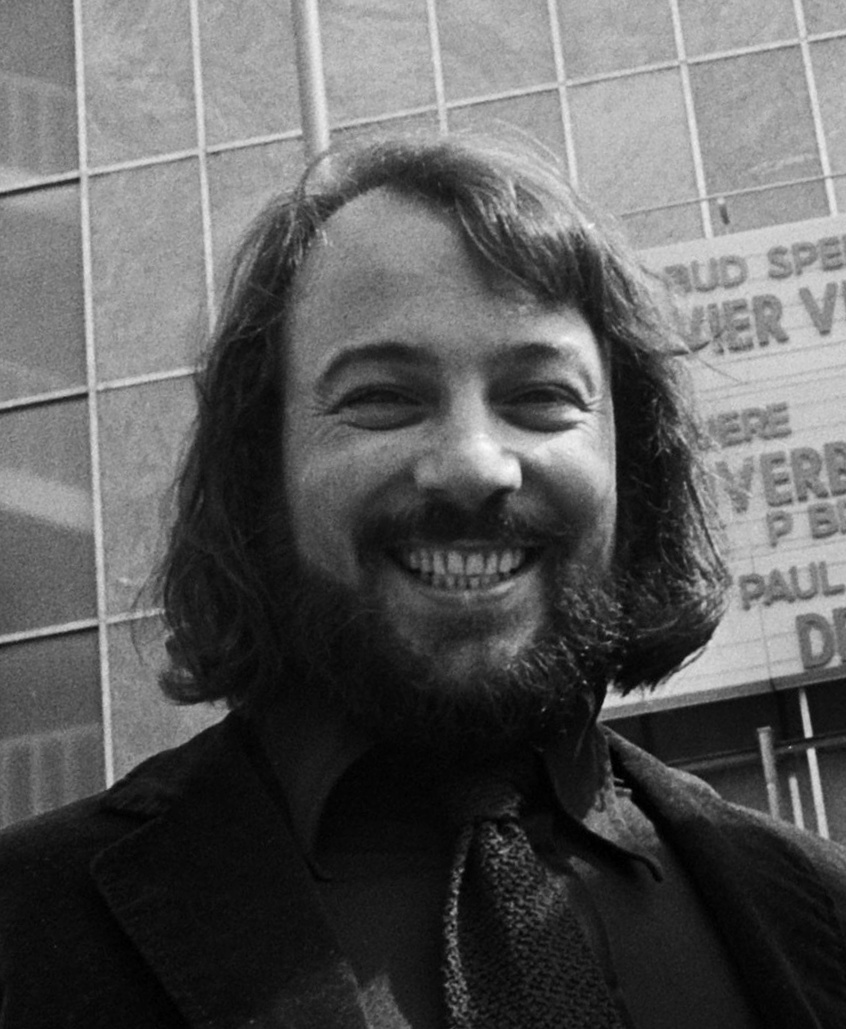
- Lasse Braun in 1976.
- Born: Alberto Ferro; 11 January 1936; Algiers, Alger, France (now Algiers, Algeria)
- Died: 16 February 2015 (aged 79); Rome, Italy
- Occupations: Pornographer, film director, producer, screenwriter, novelist and researcher
- Years active: 1961– 2015
- Children: Axel Braun

Lasse Braun (born Alberto Ferro; April 8 1936 – February 16 2015) was an Italian pornographer, film director, producer, screenwriter, novelist and researcher.

He initially produced so-called loops, ten-minute hardcore movies that he sold to Reuben Sturman, who distributed them to 60,000 American peep show booths.

Braun is the father of Axel Braun.

== Life ==
Braun was born into a wealthy, aristocratic Italian family as Alberto Ferro, and was destined to become a diplomat, following in his father's footsteps. He passed all of his law exams at the State University of Milan (1956–63), and while preparing the defense of his doctoral dissertation entitled Judiciary Censorship in the Western World, its contents and underlying radical ideas provoked so much controversy that it was promptly dismissed.

A Member of Parliament from Denmark translated the thesis into Danish; and the translation laid the foundation for the legalisation of pornography in Denmark on 4 June 1969.

Braun placed himself firmly in the tradition of 18th century pornographers such as Rétif de la Bretonne, who was the first author to coin the word "pornography" in his plea for the institutionalisation of brothels in Le Pornographe (1769) and to describe a comprehensive range of sexual variations in L'Anti-Justine ou les Délices de l'Amour (1798).

Another source of inspiration for Braun consisted of the Priapistic rituals and orgiastic festivals of the Dionysus cult, as well as ceremonies in veneration of Aphrodite (Porne), the goddess of lust and patroness of courtesans. According to Braun, censorship itself is obscene, and the suppression of sexual desire by the political and religious establishment over the centuries has only led to psychological damage and frustration.

In the early 1960s, Braun started to use his father's Corps Diplomatique number-plates to smuggle pornographic magazine into Italy, first from Monaco and then from Brussels. In 1966 he began to shoot his own short pornographic films on 8mm and distributed them all over Europe. When the Italian authorities came after him, he moved to Sweden; he was eventually sentenced in absentia to 2.5 years in prison. Beginning in 1972, he sold his loops to Reuben Sturman in the USA.

In the early 1970s, Braun moved to the Netherlands and began to make several full-length pornographic films. Later, having withdrawn from the world of pornography, purportedly out of disappointment with the purely commercial approach of American distributors and the resulting inferiority of video productions, Braun dedicated himself to writing scientific works on sexology (L'impeto di Venere, dealing with the G-spot) and on anthropology, erotic historical novels, erotic thrillers, a study of prostitution, and his autobiography.

In his 740-page novel Lady Caligula, Braun goes against the grain by portraying Caligula as a brilliant character, instead of the deranged emperor described in Edward Gibbon's Decline and Fall of the Roman Empire and in I, Claudius.

Braun died from complications of diabetes on February 16, 2015 in Rome, Italy at the age of 78.

== Movie career ==
In 1972, Braun moved to the Dutch town of Breda, where he bought an old meat factory, which was renovated to serve as his headquarters. Using women he had become acquainted with in European bars and discothèques, Braun produced his longer movies starring the Brigitte Maier, Nathalie Morin and Catherine Ringer.

In the U.S., Sturman was prosecuted for obscenity over Braun's 1972 movie Cake Orgy, but was acquitted. Three of Braun's films, Penetration (1972), Sensations (1975) and Body Love (1977), (the latter featuring a soundtrack composed by Klaus Schulze) were shown during the Cannes film festival.

Braun's movies differ markedly from the traditional so-called stag films made from 1916 onward, with storylines featuring Viking invasions, James Bond spoofs, and exotic locales such as Caribbean islands, the Dutch Groeneveld Castle, and an Amsterdam art gallery.

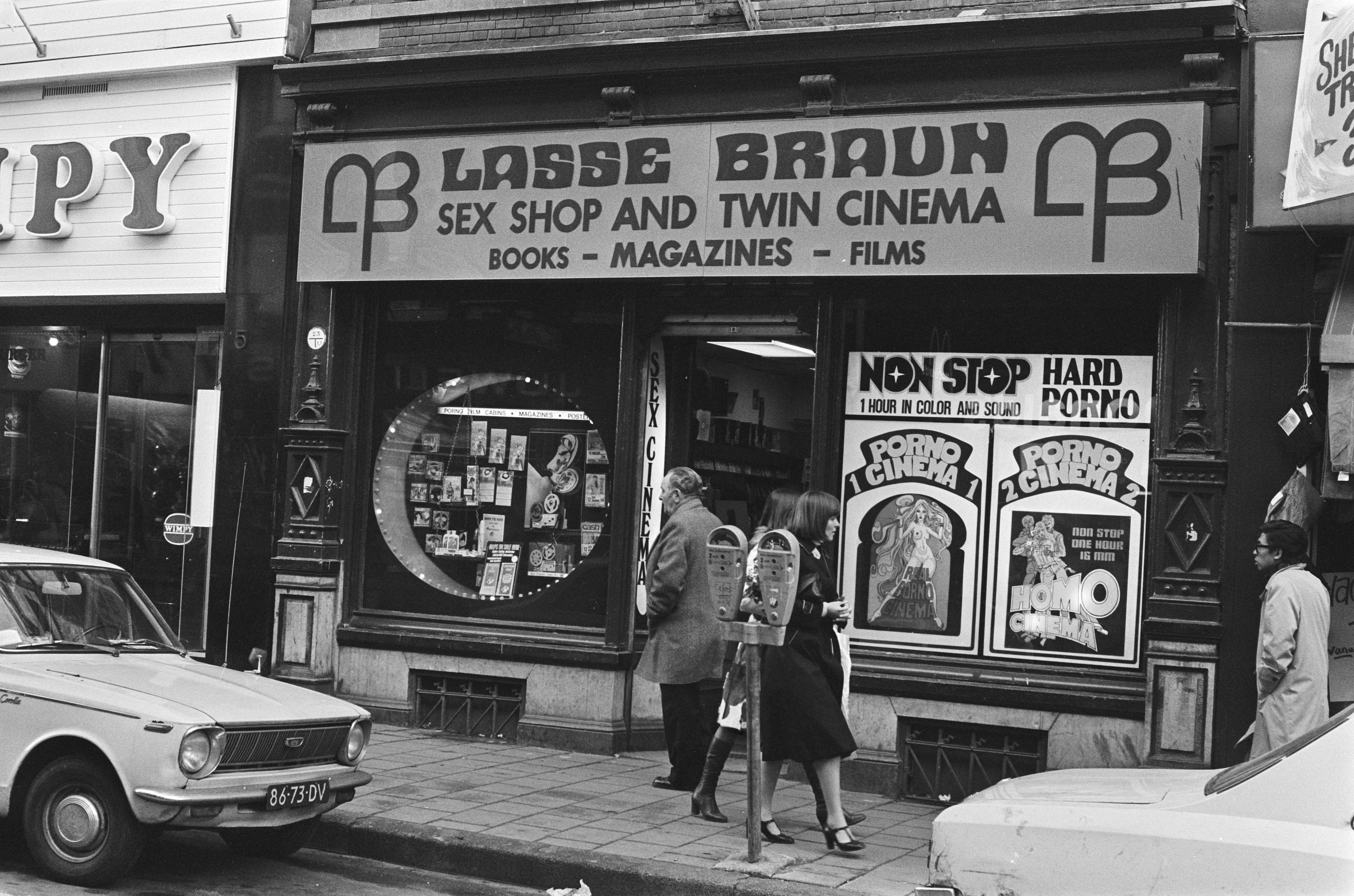
Lasse Braun Cinema in Amsterdam (1977)

After his French Blue had been shown at the Amsterdam cinema of City 2 from June until December 1977, Braun was offered a five-year contract to extend its run along with Sensations, but the Catholic Minister of Justice Dries van Agt terminated the public showing of pornographic movies by reintroducing an 1880 Law concerning fire hazard at public theatres that happened to contain more than fifty seats. Disillusioned, Braun decamped to Italy, where he made a number of softporn movies. Facing several lawsuits on charges of obscenity, Braun countered by arguing that recording the licit act of consensual sex on film could not be condemned as illicit. His only known son, Axel Braun, continued the family trade in the United States of America, after obtaining a doctorate in Psychology.

In 1980, Braun's former wife burnt his entire photo and movie archive out of fear for an impending police raid, but Braun managed to retrieve three major movies and thirty short films with the help of collectors, and re-mastered the collection on DVD. He appeared in the television series Pornography: A Secret History of Civilisation (1999) and in a documentary about himself, I, the King of Porn ... the Adventurous Life of Lasse Braun (2001).

In 1999, Braun became the first European movie director to have been inducted into the AVN Hall of Fame by Adult Video News. His son, Axel Braun, followed in his footsteps becoming the only other European movie director to have been inducted into the AVN Hall of Fame by Adult Video News in 2011. His grandson, Rikki Braun, made his directing debut in 2017 with the feature Exposed, which earned him seven AVN Award nominations including Best Director.

In 2019, Braun was awarded a posthumous AVN Best Screenplay Award for the movie The Possession of Mrs. Hyde, which he co-wrote with his son Axel Braun and his grandson, Rikki Braun. The movie took home a total of five AVN awards, including Movie of the Year.

== Partial filmography ==
- Intrigue (1999)
- Possession (1998)
- Night and Day (1998)
- Diamonds Are for Pleasure (1996)
- Tender Blue Eyes (1992)
- Un Folle Amore (1989)
- American Desire (1981)
- Sex Maniacs (1977)
- Body Love (1977)
- Love Inferno (1977)
- Satin Party (1977)
- Sensations (1975)
- French Blue (1974, originally named Penetration)
- Close-Up (1973)
- Cake Orgy (1972)

== Books by Lasse Braun ==
- Lady Caligula (1999) - erotic historic novel
- L'impeto di Venere - study of female orgasm and the G-spot
- Le notti di Palermo (2008) - mystery
- Lo scialle giallo (2004) - a history of prostitution
- Senza Tregua (2010) - autobiography
