= WTSK =

- Tuscaloosa, Alabama; United States
- Broadcast area: Tuscaloosa and vicinity
- Frequency: 790 kHz
- Branding: Praise 93.3

Programming
- Format: Urban gospel

Ownership
- Owner: Townsquare Media; (Townsquare License, LLC)
- Sister stations: WALJ, WFFN, WQRR, WTBC, WTUG-FM

History
- First air date: February 1958
- Former call signs: WTUG (1958–1980)
- Call sign meaning: Tuscaloosa

Technical information
- Licensing authority: FCC
- Facility ID: 54795
- Class: D
- Power: 5,000 watts (day); 36 watts (night)
- Transmitter coordinates: 33°11′17″N 87°35′23″W
- Translator: 93.3 W227DD (Brent)

Links
- Public license information: Public file; LMS
- Webcast: Listen live
- Website: praise933.com

WTSK (790 AM, "Praise 93.3") is a commercial radio station licensed to Tuscaloosa, Alabama, United States, airing an urban gospel format. It is owned by Townsquare Media with studios on Skyland Boulevard in Tuscaloosa.

WTSK is also heard over low-power FM translator W227DD at 93.3 MHz in Brent.

== History ==
The station signed on the air in February 1958 as WTUG. In 1980, the call letters changed to WTSK. They were chosen to represent the City of Tuscaloosa.

In February 2005, Apex Broadcasting Inc. (Houston L. Pearce, chairman) reached an agreement to sell WTSK and six other radio stations in Alabama to Citadel Broadcasting (Farid Suleman, chairman/CEO) for a reported sale price of $29 million. Citadel merged with Cumulus Media on September 16, 2011. Citadel and Cumulus owned the station for seven years.

Cumulus sold WTSK, along with its sister stations, to Townsquare Media. The transaction took effect on July 31, 2012.

WTSK provides regular weather coverage from ABC 33/40 (WBMA-LD). The chief meteorologist is James Spann. Additionally, under the ownership of Townsquare Media and the direction of Market President/Chief Revenue Officer David R. Dubose, WTSK also provides news coverage with ABC 33/40 News Director Don Hartley and traffic coverage with Traffic Reporter Capt'n Ray.

== Previous logo ==
(WTSK's logo under previous "Truth" branding)

== Translator ==
Broadcast translator for WTSK
Call sign	Frequency	City of license	FID	ERP (W)	HAAT	Class	Transmitter coordinates	FCC info
W227DD	93.3 FM	Brent, Alabama	157152	250	0 m (0 ft)	D	33°9′36″N 87°30′54″W	LMS
