= WEUP-FM =

- Moulton, Alabama; United States
- Broadcast area: Huntsville, Alabama
- Frequency: 103.1 MHz
- Branding: 103.1 WEUP

Programming
- Format: Urban contemporary

Ownership
- Owner: Broadcast One; (Hundley Batts, Sr. & Virginia Caples)
- Sister stations: WEUP (AM), WEUV, WEUZ, WHIY

History
- First air date: 1987
- Former call signs: WXKI
- Call sign meaning: "We Up"

Technical information
- Licensing authority: FCC
- Facility ID: 36740
- Class: C3
- ERP: 11,500 watts
- HAAT: 150 meters (490 ft)
- Transmitter coordinates: 34°27′08″N 87°06′20″W
- Translator: (see below)

Links
- Public license information: Public file; LMS
- Webcast: Listen live
- Website: 103weup.com

WEUP-FM (103.1 FM, "103.1 WEUP") is an urban contemporary formatted radio station that serves Huntsville, Alabama, and most of the Tennessee Valley in north Alabama, United States. WEUP-FM is known as "103.1 WEUP", often pronounced "103.1 'We Up'", and simulcast on WEUZ (92.1 FM) as well as several translators. The station's studios are located along Jordan Lane (SR 53) in Northwest Huntsville, and its transmitter is located east of Moulton, Alabama, its city of license.

== History ==
WEUP (AM) began broadcasting on March 20, 1958, on a 100-watt 1600 kHz AM station owned by Leroy and Viola Garrett, who became the first African-American owners of a radio station in the state of Alabama. WEUP-AM first broadcast from a pink trailer in the grounds of Syler Tabernacle Church in Huntsville, before moving to its present studios on Jordan Lane. The station's format was a mixture of urban contemporary gospel and soul music as well as news and public affairs catering to the interests of the Tennessee Valley's black population, everyday from sunrise to 6 p.m.

The Garretts made history when they testified before a congressional committee in 1963, the outcome of which resulted in the change of a Federal Communications Commission law regulating 24-hour broadcasts in the 1960s. That year WEUP-AM began 24-hour broadcasts, yet another milestone for urban radio.

=== Ownership changes ===
Viola Garrett decided to sell the station in 1987 after the death of her husband, Leroy. Later that year, Hundley Batts, Sr. and Dr. Virginia Caples, another married couple, assumed the ownership and operation of WEUP. They also acquired another station, WEUZ-FM (92.1 FM), licensed to Minor Hill, Tennessee, (just north of the Alabama border) and brought WEUP onto the FM broadcast airwaves.

They operated WEUP and WEUZ-FM under the parent company name of Broadcast One. They continued to expand the station's audience by acquiring WHIY (1190 AM, now WEUV) and WXKI (103.1 FM, now WEUP-FM), both licensed to Moulton, Alabama, in 1989. The stations were sold to Hundley Batts and Virginia Caples as part of a two-station deal by Moulton Broadcasting Co. Inc. (WHIY) and Lawco FM Ltd. (WXKI). WEUV (1700 AM) was later added to the group of stations that are part of the WEUP broadcast family.

The station was assigned the WEUP-FM call letters by the Federal Communications Commission on April 6, 2000.

== Translator ==
WEUP-FM programming is also carried by a broadcast translator to extend or improve the coverage area of the station.

Call sign	Frequency	City of license	FID	ERP (W)	Class	FCC info
W222AK	92.3 FM	Huntsville, Alabama	53466	8	D	LMS
