= WMFC (FM) =

- Monroeville, Alabama; United States
- Frequency: 99.3 MHz
- Branding: Kool Gold 99.3

Programming
- Format: Oldies
- Affiliations: Westwood One

Ownership
- Owner: Monroe Broadcasting Company, Inc.
- Sister stations: WMFC (AM)

History
- First air date: November 1965
- Former call signs: WMFC-FM (1965–2010)
- Call sign meaning: Monroeville-Frisco City

Technical information
- Licensing authority: FCC
- Facility ID: 43534
- Class: C2
- ERP: 30,000 watts
- HAAT: 94 meters (308 ft)
- Transmitter coordinates: 31°30′51″N 87°17′55″W

Links
- Public license information: Public file; LMS

WMFC (99.3 FM, "Kool Gold 99.3") is a radio station licensed to serve Monroeville, Alabama, United States. The station is owned by Monroe Broadcasting Company, Inc.

== Programming ==
WMFC broadcasts an oldies music format which includes satellite-fed programming from ABC Radio and Jones Radio Network. In addition to its usual music programming, the station airs University of Alabama athletics events including Crimson Tide football and basketball.

== History ==
This station began regular broadcasting in November 1965 with 3,000 watts of effective radiated power on a frequency of 99.3 MHz. Launched by the Monroe Broadcasting Company, Inc., the station and its sister station WMFC (1360 AM) were owned by William M. Stewart, publisher of the weekly Monroe Journal and South Alabamian newspaper.

WMFC-FM's original broadcast studios were located in a Quonset hut near downtown Monroeville. The station's current studios are in a brick building on Alabama State Route 21, just northeast of the city.

In December 1992, WMFC-FM was issued a construction permit by the FCC that allowed them upgrade to class C2 and to increase broadcast power to 50,000 watts from an antenna 150 meters (492 feet) in height above average terrain.

On November 30, 2010, the station changed its call sign to the current WMFC.

WMFC has been owned continuously by the Stewart family since its 1965 launch. After station founder William M. Stewart died in early 1995, ownership of Monroe Broadcasting Company, Inc., passed to his widow, Carolyn H. Stewart. The AM/FM station combo is managed by their son, David Stewart, who has been involved with the station since first hosting a weekend radio show at age 10.
