= WMHZ (AM) =

- Holt, Alabama; United States
- Broadcast area: Tuscaloosa metropolitan area
- Frequency: 1340 kHz
- Branding: Rock 106.3

Programming
- Format: Classic rock

Ownership
- Owner: TTI, Inc

History
- First air date: 2013; 13 years ago

Technical information
- Licensing authority: FCC
- Facility ID: 161136
- Class: C
- Power: 1,000 watts
- Transmitter coordinates: 33°12′52″N 87°29′22″W
- Translators: 101.3 W267CZ (Tuscaloosa); 106.3 W292DU (Tuscaloosa)
- Repeater: 92.9 WTUG-HD4

Links
- Public license information: Public file; LMS
- Website: rock1063.com

WMHZ (1340 AM) is a commercial radio station licensed to Holt, Alabama, and serving the Tuscaloosa metropolitan area. It is owned by TTI, Inc., and it airs a classic rock format. The station was assigned the WMHZ call letters by the Federal Communications Commission on March 5, 2012.

WMHZ is powered at 1,000 watts using a non-directional antenna. Programming is also heard on two FM translators in Tuscaloosa.

== Translators ==
WMHZ is rebroadcast on the FM broadcast band via two translators: W267CZ and W292DU.

Broadcast translators for WMHZ
Call sign	Frequency	City of license	FID	ERP (W)	HAAT	Class	Transmitter coordinates	FCC info
W267CZ	101.3 FM	Tuscaloosa, Alabama	200473	99	0 m (0 ft)	D	33°12′51″N 87°29′23.9″W	LMS
W292DU	106.3 FM	Tuscaloosa, Alabama	157477	250	0 m (0 ft)	D	33°12′51″N 87°29′23.9″W	LMS
