= WEUP (AM) =

- Huntsville, Alabama; United States
- Broadcast area: Tennessee Valley
- Frequency: 1700 kHz
- Branding: Worship 94.5

Programming
- Format: Urban contemporary gospel and Urban adult contemporary

Ownership
- Owner: Broadcast One; (Hundley Batts Sr. & Virginia Caples)
- Sister stations: WEUP-FM; WEUV; WEUZ; WHIY

History
- First air date: March 20, 1958 (68 years ago)
- Former call signs: WEUV (2000–2006)

Technical information
- Licensing authority: FCC
- Facility ID: 87141
- Class: B
- Power: 10,000 watts (day); 1,000 watts (night)
- Transmitter coordinates: 34°45′32″N 86°38′35″W
- Translator: 94.5 W233BR (Moores Mill)
- Repeater: WEUV (1190 kHz Moulton)

Links
- Public license information: Public file; LMS
- Webcast: Listen live
- Website: www.worship945.com

WEUP (1700 AM) is an urban contemporary gospel and urban adult contemporary formatted radio station that serves Huntsville, Alabama, and the majority of the Tennessee Valley in North Alabama, United States. WEUP is dubbed "Huntsville's Heritage Station" because it was the first in the region to broadcast an urban format. It has an urban contemporary sister station called WEUP-FM. The station's studios and transmitter are both co-located along Jordan Lane (SR 53) in Northwest Huntsville. WEUP is simulcast on WEUV (1190 AM) in Moulton, Alabama.

== History ==
WEUP originated as the expanded band "twin" of the original WEUP, which began broadcasting on March 20, 1958, as a 1000-watt station at 1600 kilohertz (kHz) on the standard AM band.

On March 17, 1997, the Federal Communications Commission (FCC) announced that 88 stations had been given permission to move to newly available "Expanded Band" transmitting frequencies, ranging from 1610 to 1700 kHz, with the original WEUP authorized to move from 1600 to 1700 kHz.

A construction permit for the expanded band station was assigned the call letters WEUV on August 7, 2000. The FCC's initial policy was that both the original station and its expanded band counterpart could operate simultaneously for up to five years, after which owners would have to turn in one of the two licenses, depending on whether they preferred the new assignment or elected to remain on the original frequency. However, this deadline has been extended multiple times, and both stations have remained authorized. One restriction is that the FCC has generally required paired original and expanded band stations to remain under common ownership.

In early 2006, there was a call letter swap between co-owned 1600 AM and 1700 AM, with 1600 AM becoming WEUV, and 1700 AM inheriting the historic WEUP call letters. (A few weeks later, the call letters for AM 1600 were changed to WHIY).

== Translators ==
WEUP programming is also carried on a broadcast translator station to extend or improve the coverage area of the station.

Call sign	Frequency	City of license	FID	ERP (W)	Class	FCC info
W233BR	94.5 FM	Moores Mill, Alabama	150832	250	D	LMS
