= WJUS =

- Marion, Alabama, United States; United States
- Broadcast area: Selma, Alabama
- Frequency: 1310 kHz

Programming
- Format: Urban Gospel

Ownership
- Owner: Grace Baptist Temple Church

History
- First air date: December 5, 1950 (as WJAM)
- Former call signs: WJAM (1950–1983); WAJO (1983–1998)

Technical information
- Licensing authority: FCC
- Facility ID: 57472
- Class: D
- Power: 5,000 watts (day); 33 watts (night)
- Transmitter coordinates: 32°38′10″N 87°18′08″W
- Translator: 94.3 W232AN (Marion)

Links
- Public license information: Public file; LMS
- Website: wjusradio.com

WJUS (1310 AM) is a radio station licensed to serve Marion, Alabama, United States. The station is owned by Grace Baptist Temple Church of Selma, Alabama.

== Programming ==
As WAJO, the station aired an urban contemporary music format until the late-2000 ownership and callsign change. As WJUS, this station aired a community-oriented Gospel music format from 2001 until Summer 2008. In Summer 2008, the station adopted a syndicated "Party Blues and Oldies" format featuring a mix of urban oldies and blues music.

In addition to its usual music programming, each Wednesday morning WJUS airs the "BodyLove" radio soap opera in which the characters deal with health problems with practical solutions and healthier eating. The program is hosted locally by registered nurse Frances Ford who brackets the show with a listener call-in show offering advice, support, and "practical steps to better health".

== History ==
New station WJAM signed on the air on December 5, 1950, with 1,000 watts of power at 1310 kHz, licensed to operate only from sunrise to sunset. On July 7, 1955, the FCC granted a request by the station to increase their broadcast power from 1,000 watts to 5,000 watts for daytime-only operation. Radio Marion, Inc., acquired the license for WJAM on July 8, 1964.

In 1973, as the station was broadcasting a full-service mix of news and country music programming, a series of complaints, both formal and informal, were filed with the FCC that WJAM was not properly serving the public interest. Citing "a lack of public affairs programming" by the station, its routine license renewal was challenged. The license held by Radio Marion, Inc., was eventually renewed for a full three-year term after a hearing in March 1976. The FCC released its initial decision on this matter on July 13, 1976.

In October 1981, Radio Marion, Inc., reached an agreement to sell WJAM to Marion Communications, Inc. The deal was approved by the FCC on May 19, 1982, and the transaction was consummated on January 19, 1983. The new owners applied to the FCC for new call letters and were assigned WAJO on June 1, 1983.

In March 1985, after the station suffered a significant financial setback the license for WAJO was involuntarily transferred from Marion Communications, Inc., to receiver William H. Dilday Jr. The transfer was approved by the FCC on March 26, 1985.

In June 1986, William H. Dilday Jr. reached an agreement to sell this station to Marion Radio, Inc. The deal was approved by the FCC on September 30, 1986, and the transaction was consummated on July 20, 1987.

On May 27, 1997, WAJO filed for renewal of its broadcast license, normally a routine paperwork matter, but after nearly a year of consideration the FCC dismissed the renewal application and terminated the station's authority to broadcast. On June 11, 1998, the station owners petitioned the FCC for reconsideration and on June 30, 1998, the Commission granted the petition, reinstated the application, and renewed that station's license. Control of the license was transferred to Rollins Broadcasting Company and the new owners applied for a new callsign. The station was assigned the current WJUS call letters by the Federal Communications Commission on October 5, 1998.

In October 2000, Rollins Broadcasting Company (Elijah Rollins III, owner) reached an agreement to sell this station to current owner Grace Baptist Temple Church (Glenn King Sr., pastor) for a reported sale price of $60,000. The deal was approved by the FCC on November 28, 2000, and the transaction was consummated on December 15, 2000. At the time of the sale, the station aired an urban contemporary music format.

== Construction permit ==
On August 9, 2006, the FCC issued WJUS a construction permit to allow this station to change its community of license to nearby Selma, Alabama. The new broadcast tower location at 32°27'16"N, 87°06'36"W would also require a reduction in daytime signal power to 1,100 watts and nighttime power to 16 watts. As of late December 2008, the station is still located in Marion, Alabama. This construction permit is scheduled to expire on August 9, 2009.

== See also ==
- WFMA (FM): another radio station in Marion
