= Moondawn =

Studio album by Klaus Schulze
- Released: 16 April 1976
- Recorded: January 1976
- Genre: Electronic music, space music, Berlin School, ambient
- Length: 52:37
- Label: Brain Records
- Producer: Klaus Schulze

Klaus Schulze chronology
| Timewind (1975) | Moondawn (1976) | Body Love (1977) |

Professional ratings
Review scores
| Source | Rating |
|---|---|
| Allmusic | 5/5 stars |
| Sputnikmusic | 5/5 |

Moondawn is the sixth album by Klaus Schulze. It was originally released in 1976, and in 2005 was the thirteenth Schulze album reissued by Revisited Records. Moondawn is Schulze's first album that was performed in a full Berlin School style, as well as his first to feature contributions from drummer Harald Grosskopf.

The 2005 Revisited reissue included the bonus track "Floating Sequence", an alternate version of "Floating". A 1995 Manikin Records "Original Master" edition of Moondawn included the bonus track "Supplement" (25:22), which was an alternate version of "Mindphaser".

== Track listing ==
All tracks are written by Klaus Schulze.

Side one
| No. | Title | Length |
|---|---|---|
| 1. | "Floating" | 27:15 |

Side two
| No. | Title | Length |
|---|---|---|
| 2. | "Mindphaser" | 25:22 |

1995 Manikin Records bonus track
| No. | Title | Note | Length |
|---|---|---|---|
| 3. | "Supplement" | alternate version of "Mindphaser" | 25:22 |

2005 Revisited Records bonus track
| No. | Title | Note | Length |
|---|---|---|---|
| 3. | "Floating Sequence" | alternate version of "Floating" | 21:11 |

== Personnel ==
- Klaus Schulze – Moog synthesizer, ARP 2600, ARP Odyssey, EMS Synthi A, Farfisa Syntorchestra, Crumar keyboards, Sequenzer Synthanorma 3-12
- Harald Grosskopf – drums
