= Blackdance =

Studio album by Klaus Schulze
- Released: 1974
- Recorded: May 1974
- Genre: Electronic music, space music
- Length: 48:32 (original); 73:52 (reissue)
- Label: Brain, Virgin
- Producer: Klaus Schulze

Klaus Schulze chronology
Cyborg (1973)	Blackdance (1974)	Picture Music (1975)

Professional ratings
Review scores
Source	Rating
Allmusic	link
Fiki	(8.7/10)

Blackdance is the third album by Klaus Schulze. It was originally released in 1974, and in 2007 was the twenty-fifth Schulze album reissued by Revisited Records. For the first time Schulze uses "real" synthesizers and a singer. "Voices of Syn" features Ernst Walter Siemon on vocals. Due to packaging and print errors on later releases, Blackdance was considered Schulze's fourth album for decades, until Klaus D. Müller, Schulze's biographer and publicity manager, discovered from searching through his personal diaries that Picture Music, thought to be the third album, was recorded after Blackdance. Despite this, the reissue labels Blackdance as Schulze's fourth album.

== Track listing ==
All tracks are written by Klaus Schulze.

Side one
No.	Title	Length
1.	"Ways of Changes"	17:14
2.	"Some Velvet Phasing"	8:24

Side two
No.	Title	Length
1.	"Voices of Syn"	22:40

2007 Revisited Records bonus tracks
No.	Title	Note	Length
4.	"Foreplay"	Recorded 1976	10:33
5.	"Synthies Have (no) Balls?"	Recorded 1976	14:42

== Personnel ==
- Klaus Schulze – synthesizer, organ, piano, percussion, 12-string acoustic guitar
- Ernst Walter Siemon: voice (on "Voices of Syn")
