= Anderson, Alabama =

- Town
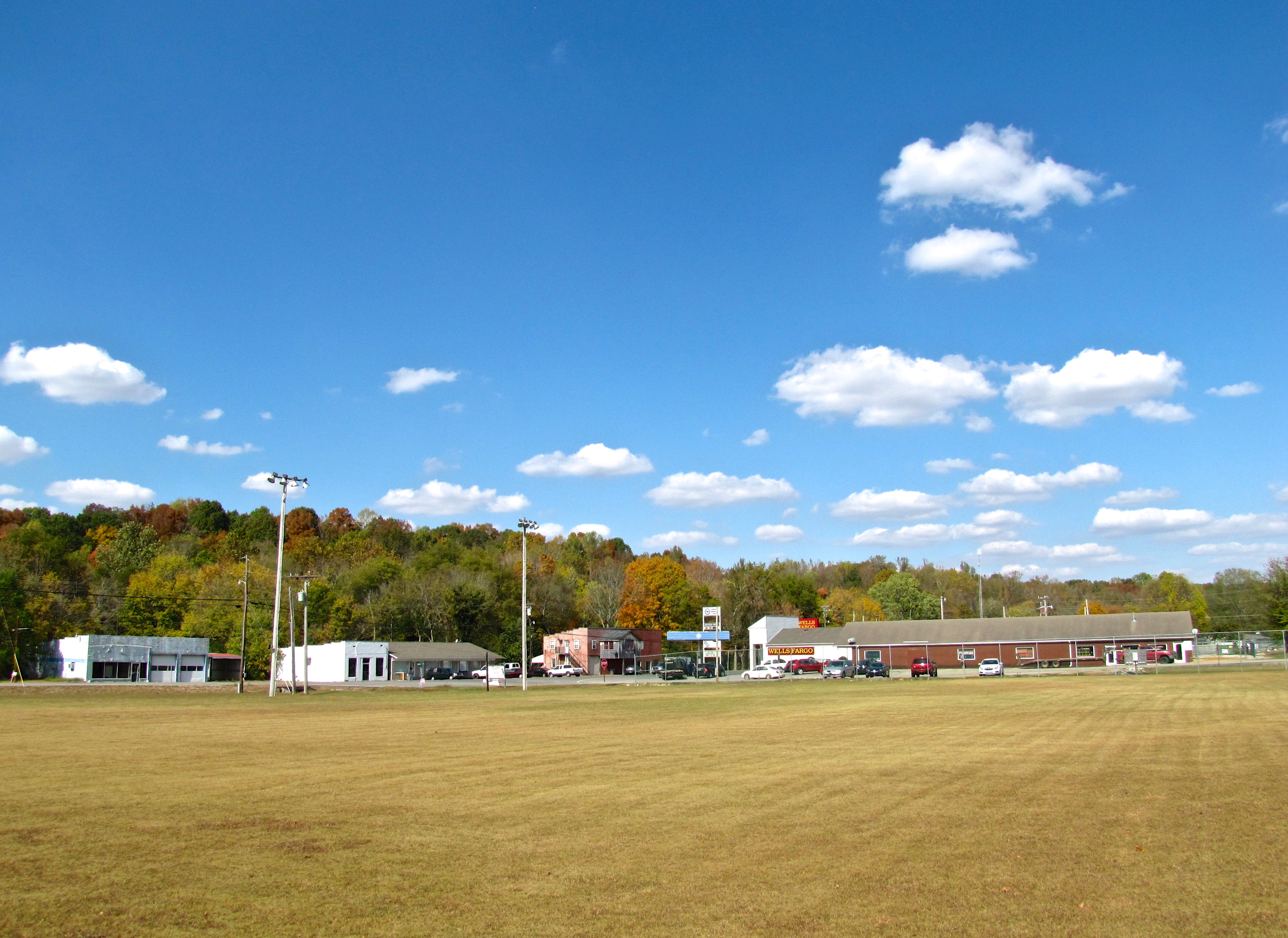
- Anderson

- Location of Anderson in Lauderdale County, Alabama.
- Coordinates: 34°54′53″N 87°16′18″W
- Country: United States
- State: Alabama
- County: Lauderdale
- Settled: 1825 (Andersons Creek)
- Renamed: 1860 (Anderson)
- Incorporated: 1973

Government
  - Type: Mayor-Council

Area
  - Total: 1.29 sq mi (3.35 km^{2})
  - Land: 1.29 sq mi (3.35 km^{2})
  - Water: 0 sq mi (0.00 km^{2})
- Elevation: 666 ft (203 m)

Population (2020)
  - Total: 254
  - Density: 196.5/sq mi (75.88/km^{2})
- Time zone: UTC-6 (Central (CST))
  - Summer (DST): UTC-5 (CDT)
- ZIP code: 35610
- Area code: 256
- FIPS code: 01-01756
- GNIS feature ID: 2405149

Anderson is a town in Lauderdale County, Alabama, United States. It is part of the Florence - Muscle Shoals Metropolitan Statistical Area known as "The Shoals". As of the 2020 census, Anderson had a population of 254.

== History ==
The town is situated along Anderson Creek, which empties into the Elk River near the Lauderdale-Limestone county border. Both the town and creek were named for Samuel Anderson, who built a gristmill along the creek in the early 19th century. The town was first settled around 1825 and was named Andersons Creek for the afore mentioned creek. The name was shortened to Anderson, and a post office was established in 1860. Anderson incorporated as a town in 1973.

== Geography ==
According to the U.S. Census Bureau, the town has a total area of 1.3 square miles (3.4 km^{2}), all land.

Anderson is situated near Anderson Creek, which is loosely paralleled by Alabama State Route 207.

== Demographics ==
Historical population
Census	Pop.	Note	%±
1970	373		—
1980	405		8.6%
1990	339		−16.3%
2000	354		4.4%
2010	282		−20.3%
2020	254		−9.9%
U.S. Decennial Census

Anderson first appeared on the 1980 U.S. Census as an incorporated town. It also included its unincorporated population from 1970, which was not originally listed on that census.

=== 2000 Census data ===
As of the census of 2000, there were 354 people, 148 households, and 107 families residing in the town. The population density was 274.1 inhabitants per square mile (105.8/km^{2}). There were 174 housing units at an average density of 134.7 per square mile (52.0/km^{2}). The racial makeup of the town was 99.15% White, 0.28% Native American, and 0.56% from two or more races.

There were 148 households, out of which 35.1% had children under the age of 18 living with them, 63.5% were married couples living together, 6.1% had a female householder with no husband present, and 27.7% were non-families. 27.0% of all households were made up of individuals, and 14.2% had someone living alone who was 65 years of age or older. The average household size was 2.39 and the average family size was 2.92.

In the town, the population was spread out, with 26.0% under the age of 18, 4.8% from 18 to 24, 28.2% from 25 to 44, 21.8% from 45 to 64, and 19.2% who were 65 years of age or older. The median age was 38 years. For every 100 females, there were 91.4 males. For every 100 females age 18 and over, there were 94.1 males.

The median income for a household in the town was $26,750, and the median income for a family was $30,962. Males had a median income of $28,125 versus $28,333 for females. The per capita income for the town was $16,477. About 13.3% of families and 13.7% of the population were below the poverty line, including 16.9% of those under age 18 and 8.2% of those age 65 or over.

== Education ==
Anderson was formerly home to Anderson Junior High School in the Lauderdale County School District. The School was from Kindergarten to 9th grade. The school closed and the zone was consolidated between Lauderdale County High School and Lexington School. There is no actual school located in Anderson.

== Culture and events ==
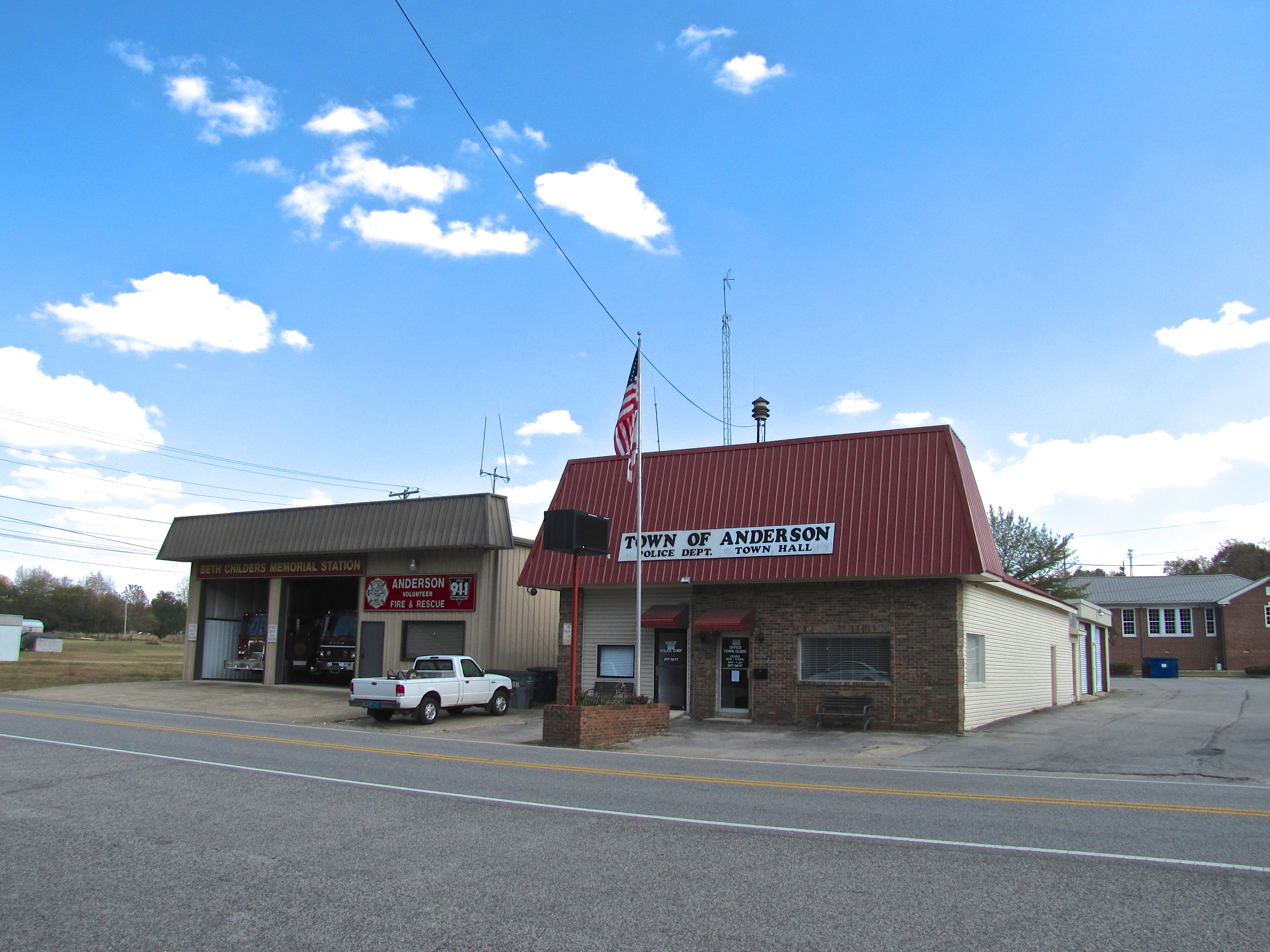
Anderson Town Hall

=== Parks ===
Anderson has a two-acre park with a walking trail, pavilion, and playground. It is located just north of the town and has a handicapped accessible area.

=== Golf ===
Anderson hosts Anderson Creek Golf Club, an 18-hole course built in 1992.

== Notable person ==
- Hugh P. Harris, a United States Army four-star general who served as Commanding General, United States Army Forces Command from 1964 to 1965.
