= WJDB-FM =

- Thomasville, Alabama; United States
- Frequency: 95.5 MHz
- Branding: CD Country 95.5

Programming
- Format: Country

Ownership
- Owner: Griffin Broadcasting Corporation

History
- First air date: September 9, 1972
- Call sign meaning: Joel Dige Bishop (station founder)

Technical information
- Licensing authority: FCC
- Facility ID: 25381
- Class: C3
- ERP: 25,000 watts
- HAAT: 160 meters (525 feet)
- Transmitter coordinates: 31°44′25″N 87°45′43″W

Links
- Public license information: Public file; LMS
- Website: WJDB 95.5

WJDB-FM (95.5 FM, "CD Country 95.5") is an American full-service radio station licensed to serve Thomasville, Alabama, United States. The station, one of only two FM stations licensed to Thomasville, is owned by Griffin Broadcasting Corporation. Griffin Broadcasting also owned Thomasville's only AM station, WJDB (now defunct). WJDB was founded in 1956.

== Programming ==
WJDB-FM broadcasts a country music format described in the station's promotions as "hot country". However, the station is locally programmed and is not a subscriber to the Hot Country satellite-fed syndicated format from Dial Global.

In addition to its regular music programming, WJDB-FM is an affiliate of the Atlanta Braves radio network, airs Auburn Tigers college football and men's basketball games, and broadcasts select local high school football and baseball games.

== History ==
The station was assigned the "WJDB-FM" call sign by the Federal Communications Commission in 1972. The station's call letters were chosen to honor the radio station's creator, Joel Dige Bishop.

In the early-to-mid-1980s, WJDB went off the air at 6:00 p.m. with the famous sign off which started with, "It's sundown in Thomasville and WJDB has concluded another day of broadcasting." While the AM station was concluding a day, WJDB-FM continued till 10:00 p.m. Taking into consideration the number of youth in the area, WJDB-FM took this opportunity to not play country music, but rather the pop music of the day, including A-Ha, DJ Jazzy Jeff and the Fresh Prince, and The Fat Boys.

In November 1990, licensee WJDB Radio, Inc., reached an agreement to sell this station to Griffin Broadcasting Corporation. The deal was approved by the FCC on January 4, 1991, and the transaction was consummated on January 31, 1991.

On October 25, 2005, WJDB-FM was granted a construction permit by the FCC to upgrade to a class C2 station, increase their effective radiated power to 40,000 watts, and relocate their broadcast transmitter to the tower site of now-defunct sister station WJDB Station owners told the local press that construction would be completed in about one year; however, the construction was not completed when the permit expired three years later on October 27, 2008, and the permit was ultimately cancelled by the FCC on November 18, 2008.

== On-air personalities ==
Trey Rowell hosts The Morning Rush weekdays from 5 am-9 am. A mix of classic country, and rock, as well as blues, folk, bluegrass, americana, and up and coming artists. Rowell also does play by play for local baseball and football games and also hosts The High School Football Scoreboard show in the fall.

=== Former ===
In August 1976, WJDB announcer and ad salesman John D. McDonald, affectionately known as "Johnny Mac", was a candidate for mayor of Thomasville, Alabama. A US Navy veteran and former member of the local school board, McDonald was elected mayor by a narrow margin.

== In popular culture ==
WJDB is name-checked as the "one good station" in the area in the mystery short story "Poachers" by Tom Franklin as published in The Best American Mystery Stories 1999, edited by Otto Penzler and Ed McBain.
