= WQRR =

Coordinates: 33.230°N 87.847°W

- Reform, Alabama; United States
- Broadcast area: Tuscaloosa, Alabama
- Frequency: 101.7 MHz
- Branding: 101.7 The River

Programming
- Format: Christian adult contemporary

Ownership
- Owner: Townsquare Media; (Townsquare License, LLC)
- Sister stations: WFFN, WTBC, WALJ, WTSK, WTUG-FM

History
- First air date: March 15, 1991 (35 years ago) (as WTID)
- Former call signs: WVRT (1982–1989, CP); WTID (1989–2003); WBEI (2003–2018)

Technical information
- Licensing authority: FCC
- Facility ID: 67577
- Class: C2
- ERP: 22,500 watts
- HAAT: 221 meters (725 ft)

Links
- Public license information: Public file; LMS
- Webcast: Listen live
- Website: 1017theriver.com

WQRR (101.7 FM, "101.7 The River") is a radio station licensed to Reform, Alabama. Owned by Townsquare Media, it broadcasts a Christian adult contemporary format serving the Tuscaloosa area.

== History ==
The station was signed on March 15, 1991, as WTID. It was assigned the WBEI call sign by the Federal Communications Commission on January 9, 2003.

In February 2005, Apex Broadcasting Inc. (Houston L. Pearce, chairman) reached an agreement to sell WBEI and six other radio stations in Alabama to Citadel Broadcasting (Farid Suleman, chairman/CEO) for a reported sale price of $29 million. Citadel merged with Cumulus Media on September 16, 2011.

Cumulus sold WBEI and its sister stations to Townsquare Media effective July 31, 2012.

On September 16, 2016, WBEI rebranded as "Star 101.7". While operating manager and afternoon DJ Greg Thomas had left the week before the flip and The Kidd Kraddick Morning Show was dropped with the change, middayer Meg Summers and the syndicated Pop Crush Nights with Lisa Paige remained in place.

On October 17, 2016, Tuscaloosa radio veteran Louie Linguini was hired to host afternoon drive, and reprise his popular "Saturday Nite Regrind With Louie Linguini" show for the station.

WBEI provided regular weather coverage from WBMA-LD Chief Meteorologist James Spann. During times of active severe, tropical, and Winter weather events, WBEI provided West Alabama's only live and local weather coverage, with local, in house, Staff Meteorologist Bobby Best.

Additionally, under the ownership of Townsquare Media and the direction of Market President/Chief Revenue Officer David R. Dubose, WBEI also provided West Alabama radio's only live and local news coverage with News Director Don Hartley and West Alabama's only live and local traffic coverage with Traffic Reporter Capt'n Ray.

On March 26, 2018, WBEI changed its format from hot adult contemporary to alternative rock, branded as "Alt 101.7". The station changed its call sign to WQRR on March 29, 2018.

In the Nielsen Audio reports, as of 2025, the afternoon show hosted by DC Daniel, has grown from outside the top 10 to the top-rated program on WQRR-FM as well as in the market.

On December 21, 2024, the station dropped the "Alt" format and began stunting as "Radio 101.7", running loops first of solely Taylor Swift songs, then changing to a loop of Michael Jackson songs on the 22nd; the station initially framed the stunt as the station being "hacked" by Russian broadcasters (to the point that the Swift portion of the stunt would include covers of her songs translated to Russian). The initial part of the stunt would earn the station a surge of attention on social media, as local and international listeners claimed the move was connected to recent reports of unmanned drones flying across various cities in the United States.

Likely to dissuade any legitimate connections, by the end of the day of the 22nd, the stunt instead shifted to 1980s music, while also starting to air Christmas-themed sweepers promoting a relaunch on December 24 at noon. At around the same time, the station's website was redirected to one revealing its new branding and format as Christian adult contemporary 101.7 The River. At midnight on December 24, the station soft launched the River branding and shifted its stunt to Christmas music–predominantly by contemporary Christian musicians—before the formal launch of its Christian AC format at noon. The new format competes primarily with K-Love station WLXQ.
