= Body Love (album) =

- Second edition cover

Soundtrack album by Klaus Schulze
- Released: February 1977
- Recorded: 1976
- Genres: Electronic music, space music, Berlin School
- Length: 52:44 (original); 75:10 (reissue)
- Label: Metronome
- Producer: Klaus Schulze

Klaus Schulze chronology
Moondawn (1976)	Body Love (1977)	Mirage (1977)

Professional ratings
Review scores
Source	Rating
Allmusic	link

Body Love is the seventh album by Klaus Schulze. It was originally released in 1977, and in 2005 was the ninth Schulze album reissued by Revisited Records. It is the original soundtrack for the porno film of the same name directed by Lasse Braun.

== Track listing ==
All tracks composed by Klaus Schulze.

Side one
No.	Title	Length
1.	"Stardancer"	13:38
2.	"Blanche"	11:44

Side two
No.	Title	Length
1.	"P:T:O:"	27:12

2005 Revisited Records reissue bonus track
No.	Title	Length
1.	"Lasse Braun"	22:26

== Personnel ==
- Klaus Schulze – electronics
- Harald Grosskopf – drums
