= Irrlicht (album) =

- Cover of 1975 Brain Records reissue

Studio album by Klaus Schulze
- Released: August 1972
- Recorded: April 1972 in Berlin
- Genres: Electronic; musique concrète; space music; drone
- Length: 50:27 (original); 74:27 (2006 reissue)
- Label: Ohr
- Producer: Klaus Schulze

Klaus Schulze chronology
Irrlicht (1972)	Cyborg (1973)

Professional ratings
Review scores
Source	Rating
Allmusic	5/5 stars

Irrlicht, (subtitled "Quadrophonische Symphonie für Orchester und E-Maschinen"; English: Will-o'-the-wisp: Quadraphonic Symphony for Orchestra and Electronic Machines) is the debut solo album by Klaus Schulze, originally released in August 1972 on Ohr Records. Recorded without synthesizers, Irrlicht's set of "early organ drone experiments" is "not exactly the music for which KS got famous". In 2006 it was the sixteenth Schulze album reissued by Revisited Records as part of a series of Schulze album reissues.

== Overview ==
Irrlicht's atmospheric drone music tone is similar to Tangerine Dream's album Zeit, released the same year. In 2005, Schulze said, "Irrlicht still has more connections to Musique concrète than with today's electronics. I still never owned a synthesizer at the time." Schulze mainly used a broken and modified electric organ, a recording of a classical orchestra rehearsal, and a damaged amplifier to filter and alter sounds that he mixed on tape into a three-movement symphony.

Irrlicht, despite its unconventional nature, was originally released on the krautrock label Ohr. Because Schulze was signed to it while a member of Tangerine Dream, the label asserted that his solo album belonged to it too; Schulze's reaction was, "I was just glad that Irrlicht was released at all. Any other company would have probably turned me away with this record."

== Track listing ==
All tracks composed by Klaus Schulze.

Side one
No.	Title	Length
1.	"1. Satz: Ebene"	23:23
2.	"2. Satz: Gewitter (energy rise—energy collaps)"	5:39

Side two
No.	Title	Length
1.	"3. Satz: Exil Sils Maria"	21:25

2006 Revisited Records bonus track
No.	Title	Length
4.	"Dungeon"	24:00

=== Notes ===
- On vinyl, "Ebene" and "Gewitter" were combined into one track, listed as 29:00 in length.
- "Satz" is the German word for the musical term "movement", therefore "1. Satz" is German for "1st Movement". Translated, the titles mean:
  - 1st Movement: "Plain"
  - 2nd Movement: "Thunderstorm"
  - 3rd Movement: "Sils Maria Exile"
- The 3rd Movement "Exil Sils Maria" was recorded backwards. The recording can be heard the way it was originally recorded by being played in reverse.

== Personnel ==
- Klaus Schulze – "E-machines", organ, guitar, percussion, zither, voice, etc.
- Colloquium Musica Orchestra (4 first violins, 4 second violins, 3 violas, 8 cellos, 1 bass, 2 horns, 2 flutes, 3 oboes) – recorded as raw material then post-processed and filtered on tape.
