= Cyborg (Klaus Schulze album) =

- Original issue cover art

Studio album by Klaus Schulze
- Released: October 1973
- Recorded: February–July 1973
- Genre: Electronic music, space music, ambient
- Length: 97:01 (original); 147:56 (reissue)
- Label: Ohr
- Producer: Klaus Schulze

Klaus Schulze chronology
Irrlicht (1972)	Cyborg (1973)	Blackdance (1974)

Professional ratings
Review scores
Source	Rating
Allmusic	4.5/5 stars

Cyborg is the second album by Klaus Schulze. It was originally released in 1973, and in 2006 was the nineteenth Schulze album reissued by Revisited Records.

All CD issues of this album prior to the 2006 reissue had the tracks "Synphära" and "Chromengel" incorrectly transposed (though the packaging was always printed correctly). "But Beautiful", the bonus track on the reissue is the first part of the concert which took place in Brussels at the Cathédrale St-Michel on 17 October 1977.

== Track listing ==
All tracks are written by Klaus Schulze.

Side one
No.	Title	Length
1.	"Synphära"	22:48

Side two
No.	Title	Length
2.	"Conphära"	25:51

Side three
No.	Title	Length
3.	"Chromengel"	23:49

Side four
No.	Title	Length
4.	"Neuronengesang"	24:43

2006 Revisited Records bonus track
No.	Title	Note	Length
5.	"But Beautiful"	Recorded at the Cathedral of St. Michael and St. Gudula, 17 October 1977	50:55

== Personnel ==
- Klaus Schulze – organ, synthesizer, vocals, percussion
- Colloquium Musica Orchestra
