= WMFC (AM) =

Monroeville, Alabama; United States
- Frequency: 1360 kHz

Programming
- Format: Defunct (was Oldies)
- Affiliations: Citadel Media

Ownership
- Owner: Monroe Broadcasting Company, Inc.
- Sister stations: WMFC

History
- First air date: April 1952; 73 years ago
- Last air date: October 2010; 15 years ago
- Call sign meaning: Monroeville-Frisco City

Technical information
- Facility ID: 43352
- Class: D (daytime only)
- Power: 780 watts (daytime only)
- Transmitter coordinates: 31°30′51″N 87°17′55″W

WMFC was a daytime-only AM broadcasting station on 1360 kHz at Monroeville, Alabama, United States. The station, launched in 1952, was owned by Monroe Broadcasting Company, Inc., and was last managed by David Stewart. It was a sister station to WMFC-FM.

== History ==
WMFC was owned continuously, in whole or in part, by the Stewart family since its 1952 launch. After station co-founder William M. Stewart died in early 1995, ownership of Monroe Broadcasting Company, Inc., including sister station WMFC-FM (99.3 FM), passed to his widow, Carolyn H. Stewart. The AM/FM station combo was managed by their son, David Stewart, who has been involved with the station since first hosting a weekend radio show at age 10.

The station began broadcast operations in April 1952 with 250 watts of power at 1220 kHz on the AM band. The station was assigned the WMFC call letters by the Federal Communications Commission. Launched by the Monroe Broadcasting Company, Inc., the station was co-owned by James H. Faulkner and by William M. Stewart, publisher of the weekly Monroe Journal and South Alabamian newspaper. In 1959, Stewart assumed sole ownership and operation of Monroe Broadcasting Company, Inc.

In 1956, the station moved to its final 1360 kHz frequency and increased its broadcast power to 1,000 watts. In November 1986, the FCC granted the station a construction permit to increase the height of its broadcast tower, reduce power to 800 watts, and relocate the transmitter site to just outside the city limits of Monroeville.

WMFC's original broadcast studios were located in a Quonset hut near downtown Monroeville. The station's final studios were in a brick building on Alabama State Route 21, just northeast of the city.

WMFC last broadcast an oldies music format, with much of the programming fed from Citadel Media's satellite network. In addition to its usual music programming, WMFC aired University of Alabama athletics events including Crimson Tide basketball and football.

Monroe Broadcasting surrendered its license for WMFC (AM) on October 12, 2010, and the station license was deleted later that month. The license for WMFC (formerly WMFC-FM) remains in effect, with that station still broadcasting as an oldies station.
