= WJDB (AM) =

DWJDB
- Thomasville, Alabama; United States
- Frequency: 630 kHz

Programming
- Format: Defunct

Ownership
- Owner: Griffin Broadcasting Corporation
- Sister stations: WJDB-FM

History
- First air date: July 16, 1956
- Last air date: March 5, 2016
- Call sign meaning: Joel Dige Bishop (station founder)

Technical information
- Facility ID: 25379
- Class: D
- Power: 1,000 watts (day); 49 watts (night)
- Transmitter coordinates: 31°52′58″N 87°44′42″W

WJDB (630 AM) was an American radio station licensed to serve Thomasville, Alabama. The station, the only AM station licensed to Thomasville, was owned by Griffin Broadcasting Corporation. Griffin Broadcasting also owns Thomasville's WJDB-FM.

It aired an adult hits music format.

== History ==
The station was assigned the "WJDB" call sign by the Federal Communications Commission.

In November 1990, licensee WJDB Radio, Inc., reached an agreement to sell this station to Griffin Broadcasting Corporation. The deal was approved by the FCC on January 4, 1991, and the transaction was consummated on January 31, 1991.

This station was reported silent in December 2011. (Taken from Alabama Broadcast Media Page) On May 17, 2017, the FCC informed WJDB that, as the station had been silent since at least March 5, 2016, it was in the process of cancelling the station's license; the license was canceled on June 29, 2017.
