= WFMA (FM) =

Air 1 radio station in Marion, Alabama

- Marion, Alabama; United States
- Broadcast area: Tuscaloosa metropolitan area
- Frequency: 102.9 MHz

Programming
- Format: Contemporary worship music
- Network: Air1

Ownership
- Owner: Educational Media Foundation

History
- First air date: 1991
- Former call signs: WBAN (1989, CP); WNPT-FM (1989–2018); WTID (2018–2019)

Technical information
- Licensing authority: FCC
- Facility ID: 37721
- Class: C2
- ERP: 24,000 watts
- HAAT: 202 meters (663 ft)
- Transmitter coordinates: 32°49′46″N 87°25′46″W

Links
- Public license information: Public file; LMS
- Webcast: Listen live
- Website: air1.com

WFMA (102.9 FM) is a non-commercial, listener-supported radio station licensed to Marion, Alabama, and serving the Tuscaloosa metropolitan area. It is owned by the Educational Media Foundation and it airs a contemporary worship music format as part of EMF's Air1 radio network.

== History ==
This station received its original construction permit from the Federal Communications Commission on March 2, 1988. The new 3,000-watt station, broadcasting at 102.9 MHz in Linden, Alabama, signed on the air in 1991.

While it was still a construction permit, it was assigned the call letters WBAN by the FCC on September 18, 1989. The call sign was changed to WNPT-FM on November 28, 1989, and remained when the station debuted. WNPT-FM received its license to cover from the FCC on February 23, 1993.

In March 1997, original owners Linden Radio Joint Venture reached an agreement to sell this station to Willis Broadcasting Corporation. The deal was approved by the FCC on April 30, 1997, and the transaction was consummated on May 10, 1997.

In February 2001, Willis Broadcasting Corporation faced significant financial difficulties and foreclosure proceedings in the Circuit Court for Marengo County, Alabama, forced the company into receivership. On March 5, 2001, an application was filed with the FCC to name Beckham Palmer III as receiver "for the purpose of protecting the FCC license". The transfer was approved by the FCC on March 14, 2001, and the completed on March 15, 2001.

In June 2001, receiver Beckham Palmer III reached an agreement to sell this station to Jason Schmitt for $450,000 and certain considerations. The deal was approved by the FCC on August 13, 2001, but Schmitt was unable to complete the transaction and the license remained with Palmer. In late July 2001, the station first applied to the FCC for permission to go off the air temporarily and remain silent, citing financial issues. The station was off the air for several long stretches until resuming normal operations in early March 2003.

Former Catfish Country 102.9 logo

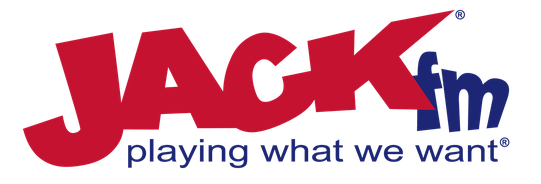
Former Jack FM branding

In October 2003, receiver Beckham Palmer III reached a new agreement to sell this station, this time to John Sisty Enterprises, Inc., for a reported sale price of $450,000. The deal was approved by the FCC on November 18, 2003, and the transaction was consummated on November 28, 2003. In October 2004, the station received FCC authorization to change its community of license from Linden to Marion, Alabama.

On December 16, 2008, WNPT-FM was granted a construction permit to relocate the transmitter to 32°49'46"N, 87°25'46"W, along with a raise in antenna height above average terrain to 202 meters (663 feet), and a drop in effective radiated power to 24,000 watts. The move was designed to increase signal coverage in Tuscaloosa as well as the southern and western areas around Birmingham. This permit is scheduled to expire on December 16, 2011.

On October 3, 2011, WNPT-FM changed its format to country music, known as "Catfish Country 102.9". The branding was a tribute to the pond catfish industry in the Black Belt region the station serves.

Logo as Tide 102.9, 2016-2019

In May 2016, Townsquare Media announced it would be buying WNPT-FM and its sister station WTBC for $550,000. According to published reports, WNPT-FM would flip to sports and WTBC would retain the Catfish Country format, once the new owners took over. The sale to Townsquare Media was consummated on July 15, 2016.

On June 30, 2016 at 3PM, the station flipped to Sports as "Tide 102.9". University of Alabama sports teams are nicknamed The Crimson Tide. On March 14, 2018, WNPT-FM changed call signs to WTID, to go with the "Tide 102.9" branding.

On June 5, 2019, Townsquare sold WTID to the Educational Media Foundation for $110,000. Upon the sale's expected closure on August 1, the Tide format would move to simulcastor W265CG/WTUG-HD2 as "Tide 100.9", and WTID 102.9 would flip to EMF's Air 1 network (as K-Love is already heard in the area on WLXQ – by coincidence, the station WTID inherited the Tide format from after its sale to EMF). With the sale, WTID would adopt the new call sign WFMA. The sale was consummated on July 31, 2019, at which point the call sign change occurred.

== See also ==
- WJUS: another radio station in Marion
