= Minor Hill, Tennessee =

- City
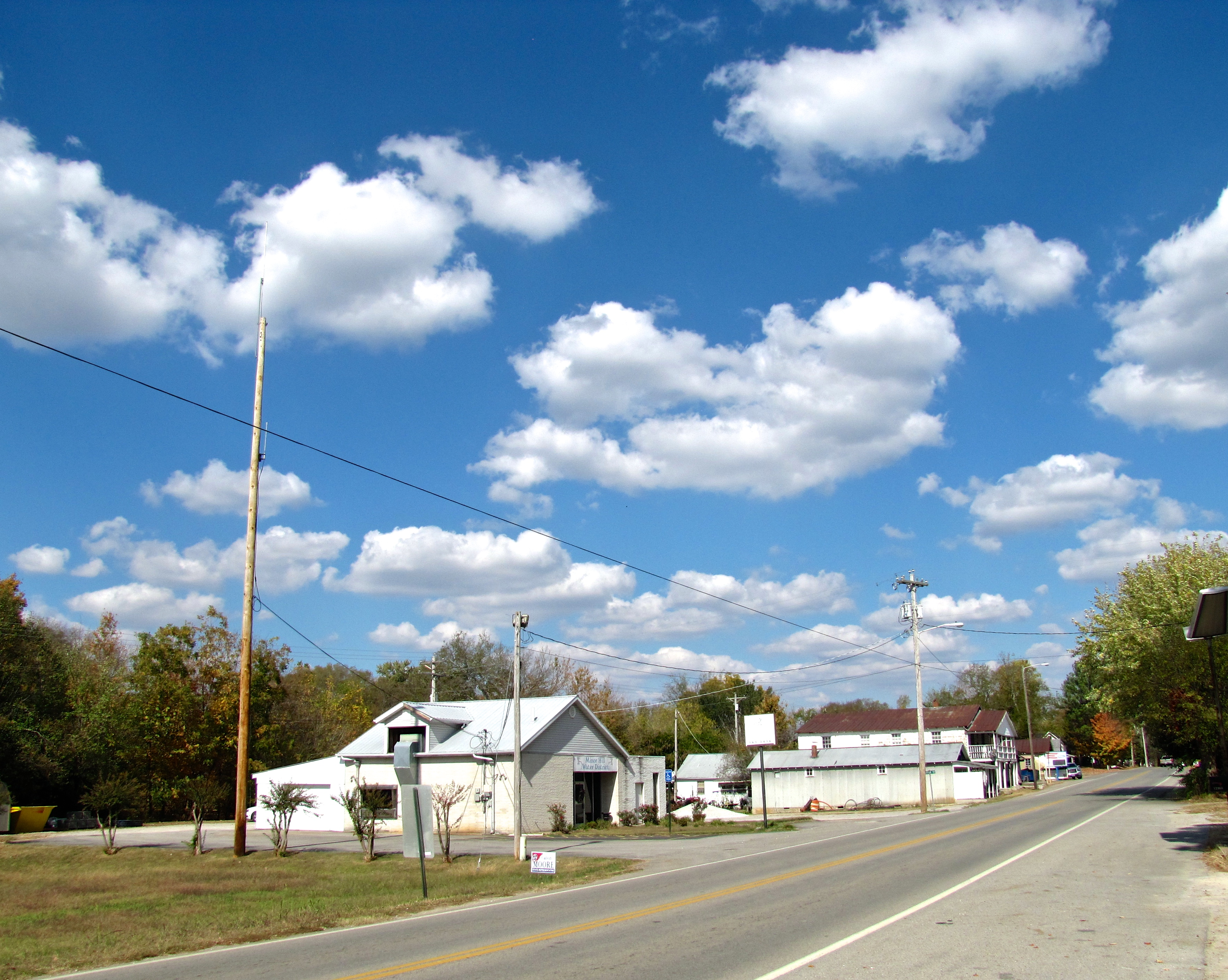
- SR 11 in Minor Hill

- Seal
- Motto: "A Friendly Place To Visit - A Great Place To Live"
- Location of Minor Hill in Giles County, Tennessee.
- Coordinates: 35°2′18″N 87°10′16″W
- Country: United States
- State: Tennessee
- County: Giles
- Incorporated: 1870

Government
  - Mayor: Tracy Wilburn
  - Vice Mayor: Larry Johnson
  - Police Chief: Randy Ervin
  - Police Reserve Officer: Roy Gulley

Area
  - Total: 1.86 sq mi (4.82 km^{2})
  - Land: 1.86 sq mi (4.82 km^{2})
  - Water: 0 sq mi (0.00 km^{2})
- Elevation: 890 ft (270 m)

Population (2020)
  - Total: 504
  - Density: 270.8/sq mi (104.57/km^{2})
- Time zone: UTC-6 (Central (CST))
  - Summer (DST): UTC-5 (CDT)
- ZIP code: 38473
- Area code: 931
- FIPS code: 47-49360
- GNIS feature ID: 1294062

Minor Hill is a city in Giles County, Tennessee, United States. The population was 504 at the 2020 census.

== History ==
Minor Hill is named for Joseph Minor, an early settler in the area. A later owner of the Minor tract donated part of it for the establishment of a school, church, and cemetery in the mid-19th century. A post office was established in 1870, and the city incorporated that same year.

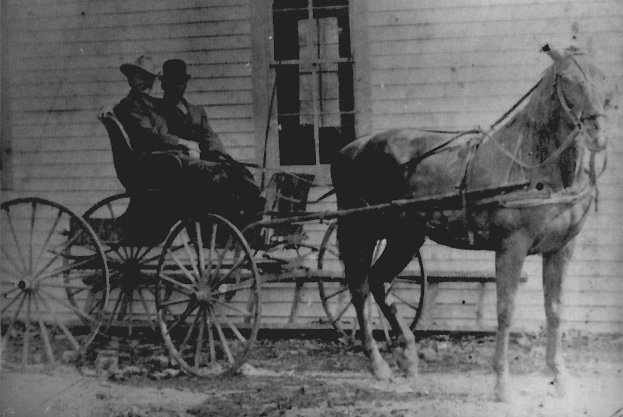
Horse-and-buggy in Minor Hill, c. 1900

On November 19, 1863, during the Civil War, Confederate scout Sam Davis was captured on Minor Hill. He was taken to Pulaski, where he was executed eight days later. A monument to Davis now stands in Minor Hill at the site where he was captured.

Noted gospel song book publisher James David Vaughan published his first song book in Minor Hill in 1900. Vaughan and three of his brothers performed as a gospel quartet throughout the region.

== Geography ==
Minor Hill is located at 35°2′18″N 87°10′16″W (35.038466, -87.171135). The city is situated atop a hill that rises nearly 200 feet (61 m) above the West Fork Shoal Creek Valley, which passes just to the east, in southwestern Giles County. State Route 11 passes through the city, connecting it to Pulaski to the northeast and Lauderdale County, Alabama, to the southwest (the road becomes Alabama State Route 207 at the state line).

According to the United States Census Bureau, the city has a total area of 1.6 square miles (4.1 km^{2}), all land.

== Demographics ==
Historical population
Census	Pop.	Note	%±
1880	31		—
1970	315		—
1980	564		79.0%
1990	372		−34.0%
2000	437		17.5%
2010	537		22.9%
2020	504		−6.1%

=== 2020 census ===
As of the 2020 census, Minor Hill had a population of 504. The median age was 39.3 years, 25.8% of residents were under the age of 18, and 16.1% of residents were 65 years of age or older. For every 100 females there were 101.6 males, and for every 100 females age 18 and over there were 105.5 males age 18 and over. 0.0% of residents lived in urban areas, while 100.0% lived in rural areas.

There were 206 households in Minor Hill, of which 37.4% had children under the age of 18 living in them. Of all households, 48.5% were married-couple households, 22.3% were households with a male householder and no spouse or partner present, and 22.3% were households with a female householder and no spouse or partner present. About 26.7% of all households were made up of individuals and 12.1% had someone living alone who was 65 years of age or older.

There were 236 housing units, of which 12.7% were vacant. The homeowner vacancy rate was 2.9% and the rental vacancy rate was 5.0%.

Racial composition as of the 2020 census
Race	Number	Percent
White	481	95.4%
Black or African American	4	0.8%
American Indian and Alaska Native	0	0.0%
Asian	3	0.6%
Native Hawaiian and Other Pacific Islander	0	0.0%
Some other race	0	0.0%
Two or more races	16	3.2%
Hispanic or Latino (of any race)	5	1.0%

=== 2000 census ===
As of the census of 2000, there was a population of 437, with 181 households and 129 families residing in the city. The population density was 275.2 inhabitants per square mile (106.3/km^{2}). There were 200 housing units at an average density of 126.0 per square mile (48.6/km^{2}). The racial makeup of the city was 98.63% White, 0.46% African American, 0.23% from other races, and 0.69% from two or more races. Hispanic or Latino of any race were 0.69% of the population.

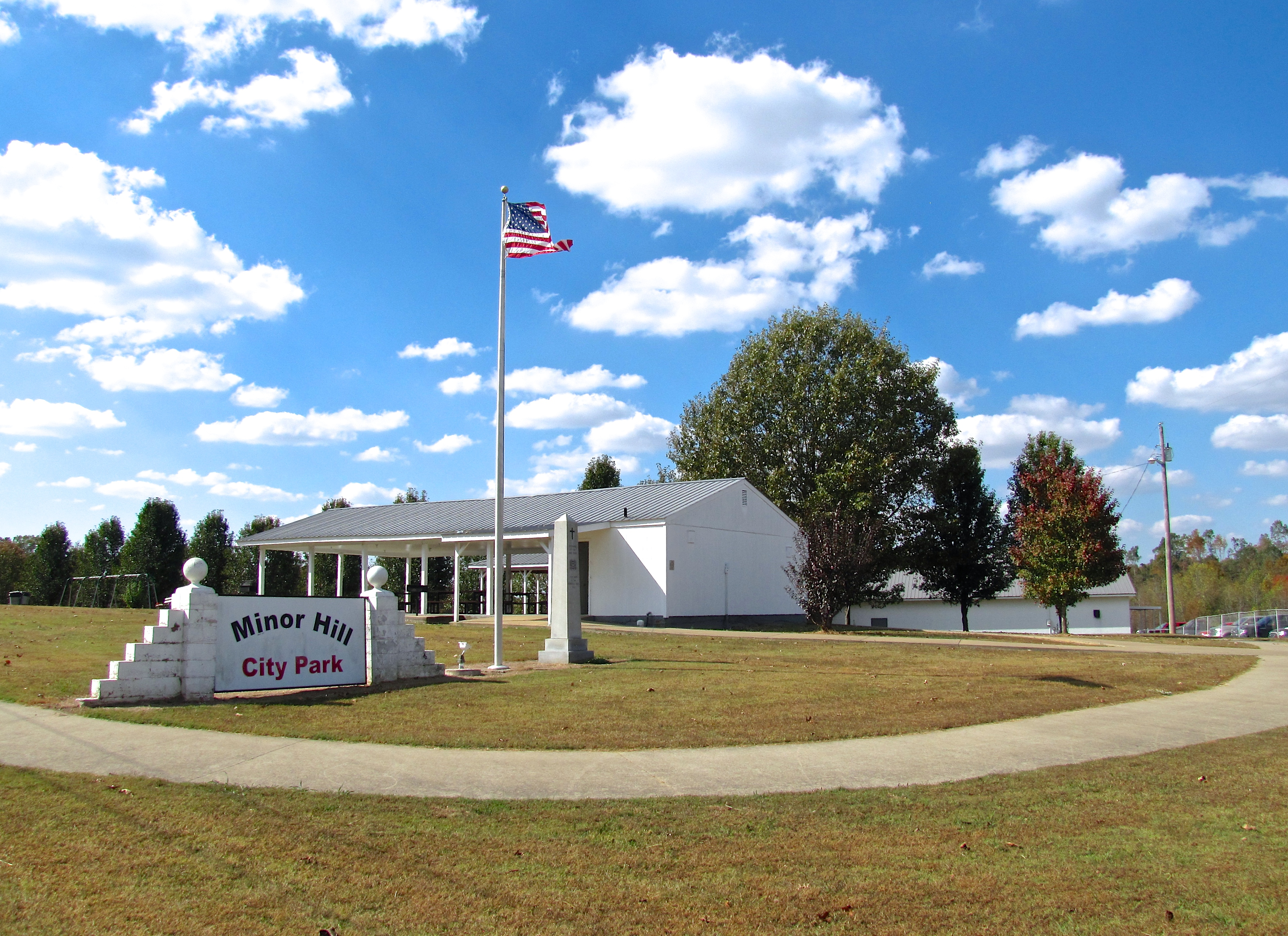
Minor Hill City Park

There were 181 households, out of which 32.0% had children under the age of 18 living with them, 56.9% were married couples living together, 11.6% had a female householder with no husband present, and 28.7% were non-families. 28.7% of all households were made up of individuals, and 14.4% had someone living alone who was 65 years of age or older. The average household size was 2.41 and the average family size was 2.95.

In the city, the population was spread out, with 27.5% under the age of 18, 6.9% from 18 to 24, 28.6% from 25 to 44, 18.8% from 45 to 64, and 18.3% who were 65 years of age or older. The median age was 36 years. For every 100 females, there were 86.8 males. For every 100 females age 18 and over, there were 92.1 males.

The median income for a household in the city was $27,625, and the median income for a family was $30,714. Males had a median income of $26,645 versus $23,250 for females. The per capita income for the city was $13,373. About 14.5% of families and 13.6% of the population were below the poverty line, including 14.8% of those under age 18 and 6.9% of those age 65 or over.

== Points of interest ==
- Huntsville TV Tower
