= 2010 in North American radio =

The following events occurred in radio in 2010.

== Events ==
- Date Unknown: CHOI/Quebec City flips from Alternative Rock to News/Talk.
- January 4: KJCS/Lufkin, Texas, goes silent.
- January 5: Melanie Morgan quits her job as host of the nationally syndicated newsmagazine America's Morning News. The show will continue with the remainder of the show's staff.
- January 6: KTTB/Minneapolis-St. Paul drops Rhythmic contemporary for Top 40 and adopts the "Now" moniker.
- January 7: John Lynch's Broadcast Company of the Americas acquires the programming operations of Rhythmic XHITZ, Alternative XETRA-FM and Rhythmic AC XHRM/Tijuana-San Diego from Finest City Broadcasting in a foreclosure sale after Finest City was forced to sell its assets to pay off a massive debt.
- January 8: WDUQ/Pittsburgh is put on the selling block by Duquesne University.
- January 21: Air America Radio files for Chapter 7 bankruptcy and ceases operations effective immediately; WNYZ-LP/New York City ends its simulcast of WPTY/Long Island due to its planned conversion to ASTC digital.
- January 28: Radio Disney takes six outlets silent as parent company Walt Disney prepares to sell the stations off to different owners.
- January 29: The FCC Media Bureau adopts news rules that will allow FM stations to increase their digital IBOC signals' power up to 10% of their analog power.
- February 1: CBS Radio places KFWB/Los Angeles in a trust.
- February 1: Doug Stephan joins United Stations Radio Networks.
- February 11: KYZZ/Monterey drops Rhythmic for Oldies
- February 12: CBS Radio announces that it will no longer have its radio station webcasts stream outside the United States due to royalty issues. This also include their news, sports and talk outlets as well
- February 14: Classic Hits WRAK/Albany, Georgia, is the latest Clear Channel O&O to jump on the "Gen X" 1980s-1990s hits format.
- February 15: KSTP-AM/Minneapolis-St. Paul drops Talk for ESPN Radio
- February 15: WBZW/Pittsburgh drops Top 40 for the second time in its history for Sports Talk as "93.7 The Fan." Sister station WZPT, currently an Adult Top 40 station, will merge its playlist and airstaff with the former WBZW.
- February 15: WRCE/Watkins Glen, New York, returns to the air at low power after its tower was destroyed in December.
- February 15: WCDV/Baton Rouge drops AC for the "Gen X" format, the first non-Clear Channel O&O to do so.
- February 15: J. D. Hayworth, a talk show host on KFYI/Phoenix, Arizona, announces his entry into the United States Senate election in Arizona, 2010, against incumbent John McCain.
- February 15: Citadel Media shuts down its "Timeless" satellite feed 2 days later than scheduled due to a decline in affiliates and advertisers.
- February 22: KSTN-FM/Stockton, California, drops its regional Mexican format, after having carried it for at least some of its broadcast day since 1963, and switches to the K-LOVE network.
- February 22: WWMM/Birmingham drops Triple-A for Talk, as it picks up the latter's format from sister station WAPI
- February 26: A pair of surprise format flips takes place, with WYCL/Pensacola, Florida, dropping AC for Rhythmic Hot AC and adopts "The Groove" moniker, while WZMR/Albany, New York, drops Active Rock for Country
- March 3: KSSJ/Sacramento drops Smooth AC for Alternative as "Radio 94.7."
- March 5: The culmination of a massive shuffling of radio formats takes place in Central New York:
  - WLTI/Syracuse, a Citadel station, drops AC for mixed talk on March 3, competing with WFBL and WSYR, adopting the call sign WXTL three weeks later. Delilah is picked up by former rival WYYY (WYYY and the rights to Delilah's show are both owned by Clear Channel), displacing John Tesh from the market.
  - WFBL responds by dropping its lone local host, Jon Alvarez.
  - The Central New York-based The Game (WIXT/WRNY/WTLB) radio network affiliates with ESPN Radio and expand into the Syracuse and Oswego markets via WTLA and WSGO, along with two AM-to-FM translators.
  - WNSS/Syracuse, WLTI's sister station and the former ESPN affiliate for Syracuse, changes its call sign to WSKO and adopts the branding "The Score" in late February. On March 5, the station picks up Citadel's Imus in the Morning (at the time on WHEN) and affiliates with Sporting News Radio.
  - WHEN, already running Fox Sports Radio for dayparts other than Imus, replaces Imus with Fox Sports Radio's morning show.
  - WNRS/Herkimer (which had held the ESPN affiliation for the Mohawk Valley, including Utica and Rome) switched to a mix of Fox Sports Radio, Imus, and Bloomberg Radio.
- March 5: The studios of Urban contemporary outlet KJMZ/Lawton, Oklahoma, became a crime scene as the station's computers, monitors, television sets, webcams and two transmitter tubes (which were used to get the station back to full power following a series of severe winter storms in the area which crippled the station's tower) were stolen from the property in the early morning hours.
- March 7: Retiring Congressman Eric Massa, just days after announcing his resignation, takes to the airwaves on WKPQ to accuse national Democrats of forcing him out of office.
- March 8: WXKS/Boston will dump its Regional Mexican format and replace it with all-talk "Rush Radio;" it swaps callsigns with sister station WKOX a week prior. The station began stunting the week prior with a sound collage of clips from the shows it was going to air and Ronald Reagan speeches.
- March 8: Another Albany, Georgia station makes a format switch, as WKZZ returns to the airwaves as an Adult Top 40 after stunting for 72 hours with "The Wheel of Formats."
- March 11: "Psycho Mike" Catherwood is named the permanent co-host of Loveline.
- March 12: KPMZ/Dallas-Ft. Worth dumps its oldies format and begins stunting with "Reagan Radio" in preparation for a format change to news/talk as a simulcast of WBAP on March 15.
- March 12: Oldies KCAR-FM/Joplin, Missouri, flips to an all-comedy radio format. Though AM stations have used the format in the past, this is first time ever that a full-time Comedy format has appeared on the FM band in the United States. Incidentally, Ronald Reagan clips will also be part of this format.
- March 16: National Geographic Radio moves from Salem Radio Network to United Stations Radio Networks.
- March 17 Kansas City picks up a new Active Rock outlet, as Cumulus Media launches "103.7 The Dam." The signal, which is actually a Class-A translator, is also the HD2 subchannel of Classic Rock sibling KCFX.
- March 19: WAOB/Pittsburgh returns to the air with a new "Catholic Radio" format.
- March 19: WIHB/Charleston, South Carolina, drops Top 40/CHR for Urban as "92.5 The Box."
- March 26: XM/Sirius station MLB Home Plate was rebranded to MLB Network Radio, and will simulcast some of TV channel MLB Network's shows such as MLB Tonight.
- March 26: Just 10 months after dropping Smooth Jazz for Country, WDSJ/Dayton, Ohio, flips formats again, this time to Classic Hits
- March 29: Big Boy's Neighborhood, having ended its run on Citadel Media on March 26, moves to Dial Global.
- March 31: WWPW/Louisville ends its simulcast of WAY-FM Network affiliate WRVI to go Urban as "104.3 The Beat"; Hot AC WKIM/Memphis takes the "Gen X" format
- April 1: After 9 months of FM Talk, KPWT/San Antonio silences the format in anticipation of a flip to adult album alternative on April 5. (See also April 15 below)
- April 2: Clear Channel takes a pair of outlets and flips them to Top 40/CHR; Rhythmic WLWD/Lima, Ohio and Country WIBL/Augusta, Georgia
- April 15: Coinciding with tax day, KRPT/San Antonio, Texas, drops its all-Texas country format for syndicated talk as "92.5 The Patriot." The lineup is almost identical to KPWT's former lineup, with all programming from Cox Radio and Talk Radio Network (see April 1 above).
- April 20: After 14 years as a Triple-A outlet, KENZ/Salt Lake City become the latest Citadel O&O to flip to the "Gen X" format
- April 22: Longtime Hot AC WMXB/Richmond flips to a hybrid Alternative/Hot AC direction as "103.7 The River."
- April 27: Just seven days after KENZ/Salt Lake City flipped to the "Gen X" format, Classic Rock KYLZ adopts a Triple-A leaning Modern AC format to pick up some of KENZ's displaced listeners
- April 29: Another Richmond, Virginia outlet switches formats as Alternative WDYL flips to Rhythmic Top 40 as "Hot 100.9." WDYL is also the sister station of WMXB, who in turn dropped Hot AC for Alternative a week earlier
- April 30: KKHI/Denver moved its Smooth Jazz format to the internet. With this move, KKHI becomes the fourth station in Denver to drop the Smooth Jazz format.
- April 30: Corus Entertainment sells all of its stations in Quebec, including four in Montreal, one in Quebec City, and one outside Ottawa, to Cogeco.
- May 3: Regent Communications changes its name to Townsquare Media
- May 3: The home of the Grand Ole Opry is flooded due to the Cumberland River in Nashville overflowing its banks, resulting in the Opry moving most of its performances back to the Ryman Auditorium (the Opry's winter home and its regular home from 1943 to 1974) and the rest to the War Memorial Auditorium (an even earlier Opry venue, used from 1936 to 1943).
- May 4: KSYU/Albuquerque, New Mexico, drops Rhythmic AC for adult contemporary.
- May 11: In the Chico, California, market, KZAP "The Pig" has flipped from the Adult album alternative format to News/Talk. The almost-all syndicated "Bold Talk" lineup will include Glenn Beck from 7 to 10 am, followed by Laura Ingraham from 10 to 12noon. There will be local programming from 12 to 1 pm including news, and then the syndicated Jerry Doyle airs from 1 to 3 pm, with Mark Levin from 3 to 6 pm, followed by Jason Lewis and Phil Hendrie.
- May 11: Lexington, Kentucky's Clear Channel-owned WMKJ (105.5) keeps the 1970s & 1980s music, but rebrands as "Rewind 105.5." The station drops the former branding "Magic 105.5".
- May 14: After 8 years as an Urban, WMIB/Miami, Florida, flipped to Spanish Adult Contemporary format at noon. The news was announced via airstaffers through their Twitter pages.
- May 17: Salem Communications flips WWRC from business talk to conservative talk. Salem News/Talk VP Tom Tradup says "we are thrilled to extend SRN's 'footprint' in our nation's capital." In addition to WWRC, Salem also owns Christian teaching WAVA-FM (105.1) in the Washington market.
- May 18: KZBD/Spokane, Washington, drops Alternative for Top 40/CHR and adopts the "Now" moniker. This is the first time since KZZU flipped to Adult Top 40 in 2005 that Spokane had a Mainstream Top 40 outlet
- May 26: 6 New Northwest Broadcasters stations could possibly be sold in the near future. KBBO, KJOX, KHHK, KARY, KXDD, KRSE have been placed under receivership in attempt to prevent station bankruptcy. Principal of Revitalization Partners, Alan Davis says "The stations are on the air; it's business as usual. I can only tell you there appears to be demand for the stations."
- May 27: The Milwaukee radio dial became the latest radio market to see a surprise shakeup in two days:
  - At noon on 27th, WJZX flipped from Broadcast Architecture's syndicated satellite feed Smooth AC "Smooth Jazz Network," to stunting as "Tiger Radio, Music For Cheaters & The Ones They Have Cheated On" playing cheating songs. The station is expected to flip to Rhythmic Top 40 after stunting and will retain its airstaff. The new station changed their call letters to WNQW standing for "Now."
  - Ironically, the following day, May 28, Clear Channel owned WQBW flips from Classic rock to Top 40 calling themselves "Now 97.3", later changing to new calls WRNW on June 10. The move comes as WJZX continues to stunt and to supposedly flip to the same branding, but it also left open talk of another move by that station.
- May 27: KFTI 1070 switched from Classic Country to Oldies music. The new station will air music from the late 1950s through the early 1980s, with an emphasis on mid-1960s through mid-1970s.
- May 28: Andrew Napolitano leaves Fox News Talk's Brian and the Judge, leaving Brian Kilmeade to host the show solo under the title "Kilmeade and Friends."
- May 28: WSHR switched formats from a Jazz and Variety mix to Contemporary hit radio as "91.9 The Arrow."
- May 31 Clear Channel's Austin, Texas, outlets, Rhythmic KFMK and Contemporary Christian KPEZ, will swap frequencies
- June 3: The Arizona studios of Cameron Broadcasting burn down in a fire, temporarily silencing KAAA, KZZZ, KFLG and KLUK, along with two other stations.
- June 4: News breaks that Tribune Broadcasting may be in negotiations to lure away talk radio hosts Mike McConnell and Bill Cunningham from WLW in Cincinnati.
- June 5: Bob Brinker's Moneytalk, the last remaining show from ABC's 1980s "TalkRadio" network, is scheduled to cease its Saturday broadcasts and go strictly to a once-a-week Sunday show.
- June 7 :The syndicated Rickey Smiley Morning Show replaces the also syndicated Russ Parr's morning show on Cleveland's WENZ.
- June 7: Milwaukee's WNQW finished stunting, debuting Classic country music. The station's branding is "Big Buck Country 106.9."
- June 8: In Taos, New Mexico, ASKK Media buys KLNN for $35,000. ASKK also purchases a majority owner stake on KTAO.
- June 10: KBEZ in Tulsa, Oklahoma, flipped formats from an Adult Contemporary format to an Adult Hits format at noon.
- June 11: Alternative WEBX/Champaign-Urbana flips to Rhythmic as "93.5 The Beat." With this flip, they take on similarly format rivals WCZQ and WUIL for listeners in this small-sized radio market.
- June 11: After a year as a Top 40, KYMV/Salt Lake City returned to Rhythmic AC, the first MOViN-branded outlet to do so.
- June 14: KRLA added Glenn Beck's radio show to their lineup. KRLA marks the 400th affiliate for Glenn Beck's syndicated program.
- June 14: Citadel announced that Talk WNOX/Knoxville, Tennessee, will move its format to the 98.7 FM frequency of sister Oldies WOKI as Citadel's LMA of the 100.3 FM frequency from Oak Ridge FM come to an end. The move will take place July 2 with a simulcast before settling in its new home August 9.
- June 14: Ending nearly thirty years of continuous country music, Colonial Radio Group changes WLMI/Kane, Pennsylvania, to WUMT, a classic rock/AAA station. The same company flips the translator for WXMT-HD2 from W237CS (95.3 MHz) to W230BO (93.9), establishing a sports radio format on that channel.
- June 21: New York's WKTU honored Michael Jackson's death anniversary by presenting the website Thankyoumj.com where comments could be made.
- June 21: KBOZ and WIBQ introduce Don Imus' syndicated program to their line-ups.
- June 21: WRXP shortens their branding from "New York's Rock Experience" to Rock 101.9."
- June 23: CHUM Radio, a division of CTVglobemedia, announced that it would be buying Rhythmic Top 40 CFXJ/Toronto, pending CRTC approval. This deal, which could CHUM/CTVglobemedia its first Toronto FM duopoly (as it already owns Adult Top 40 CHUM-FM in the same radio market), would mark the first time since Milestone and CHUM joint ventured on bringing co-owned Top 40/CHR sister station CHBN to the air in Edmonton in 2005. It was also announced that CHUM/CTVglobrmedia would also sell CHBN to Rogers Media after the latter announced its deal to buy the station along with another outlet in London, Ontario, Adult Hits CHST-FM
- June 28: Alternative WRXS/Columbus is the latest Clear Channel outlet to switch to the "Gen X" format
- June 30: Canadian Top 40/CHR Radio Station Vibe98.5/Calgary is rebranded to Virgin Radio Calgary at 12 noon MDT. This is to bring the station in line with Virgin stations in Vancouver, Toronto, Ottawa and Montreal.
- June 30: KMBH-FM/Harlingen, Texas, was knocked off the air during Hurricane Alex, which damaged the station's tower. According to a local newspaper, it could take months to have repairments.
- July 1: Another Columbus, Ohio outlet makes a major change, as WWCD moves its Alternative format and call letters from its former home at 101.1 to the 102.5 signal, previously occupied by WCVZ. The 101.1 signal will be purchased by Ohio State University and will launch a News/Talk format on that frequency.
- July 1: At 6:00 am, WNRR/Augusta, Georgia, dropped conservative talk for Standards holding the new call letters WEZO.
- July 1: KSNE/Las Vegas drops popular evening host Delilah from their lineup. No replacement has been announced or why they dropped Delilah.
- July 2: Alternative WJSE/Atlantic City, New Jersey, flipped to Dance Top 40 as "Wild 102.7" with the calls WWAC.
- July 2: The classic country music returned to the airwaves for WKVL/Knoxville. The station will target 1950s through 1980s country.
- July 3: SiriusXM will launch a fantasy league channel. It will feature live broadcast for sports such as fantasy football, baseball, basketball, NASCAR, soccer, hockey and golf. For XM, it will air on channel 147. For Sirius, it will be heard on 211.
- July 4: Former San Diego KSON PD John Marks who resigned recently will program Sirius XM's country channel.
- July 5: A format shakeup in Myrtle Beach, South Carolina, takes place, with WDAI shifting from Urban AC to R&B/Hip-Hop and WSEA going from R&B/Hip-Hop to Top 40/CHR as "i100"
- July 6: WBOB moved up the frequency from 1320 to 1530.
- July 6: Winnipeg's CHNK changed format to classic rock from country music, taking the branding "World Class Rock."
- July 6: St. Louis' KFUO-FM will depart from Classical music in the evening, the last offering will Beethoven's 9th Symphony. The next day will introduce Contemporary Christian music at 7 am as "Joy FM."
- July 7: In North Windham, Maine, WXTP will introduce a Roman Catholic talk station.
- July 8: Dallas' KVTT will sign off after 34 years on the air.
- July 8:Barbara Walters will continue her satellite radio show on SiriusXM on Monday, July 12, 2010, after undergoing heart surgery.
- July 8:National Public Radio announced that it looks to being called simply "NPR."
- July 8:KTIE is the next station to add Glenn Beck to their lineup.
- July 9: Gayle King's syndicated radio show welcomes two more affiliates, KTLK and WAOK.
- July 12: Russ Martin returned to the airwaves on KEGL in Dallas, Texas.
- July 12: Boston's business talk station WBIX is sold for $1 million to Holy Family Communications, a Roman Catholic radio group. The station plans to be WQOM once the new format debuts.
- July 12: Clear Channel Communications donates four AM stations to the Minority Media & Telecom Council: WYNF (Augusta, Georgia), WHJA (Laurel, Mississippi), KMFX (Wabasha, Minnesota), KWHN\KYHN (Fort Smith, Arkansas).
- July 13: Leesburg's WLBE is blown off the air, due to a lightning strike affecting station's tower.
- July 13: Louisville's WZKF sheds the "Kiss" moniker for "Radio Now."
- July 13: The FCC fines low-power station KEIF-LP for unauthorized commercial announcements and exceeding antenna signal.
- July 14:Curtis Media presents a trimulcast with three of their stations: WMFR, WSML, WCOG all serving North Carolina's Piedmont Triad region. It will offer: Mike & Mike from ESPN (mornings), David Glenn from WCMC, Mark Packer (afternoons), and other ESPN programming.
- July 15:ACME Broadcasting's WQMS (1500) is sold to a California company, Matadors LLC. The station has been dark since August 15, 2009.
- July 16:Sirius XM opens the gates on airing the 2010 British Open.
- July 16: It was announced Denver will gain yet another sports talk station, this time it is KDSP. According to a local news outlet, the station would possibly start airing as early as Monday.
- July 16: Oldies KLIO/Wichita, Kansas, announced they will add American Top 40 with Casey Kasem starting July 25.
- July 17:WRQQ sheds alternative rock for Classic Hits.
- July 19: NPR's Fresh Air program is officially dropped by Mississippi Public Broadcasting radio because of "recurring inappropriate content", shortly after the broadcast of an interview with comedian Louis C.K. in which he discussed his sex life. However, after facing a public outcry from listeners, MPB placed the show back on its lineup on July 26, this time airing it at 9 pm (CT) and adding a warning for adult content to the broadcast.
- July 19:KOCD sheds smooth AC for adult contemporary.
- July 19:Glenn Beck is diagnosed with macular degeneration.
- July 20: Clear Channel Communications clears two more stations for donation. They are Newton's WTOC and Minneapolis' KFXN.
- July 21: Slacker adds ABC News to their selection.
- July 22: Hamilton, Ontario AM CHAM abandons its two-year talk radio experiment and reverts to country music.
- July 23:Adult Contemporary KLRK/Waco, Texas, has rebranded itself as "Mix," shedding the previous "Star 92." Along with a new branding, the station rolls in new call letters KRMX.
- July 23: New Orleans' WDVW hangs up the Modern AC format for alternative rock.
- July 24: Snooki, JWoww and the rest of the cast from the MTV reality show "Jersey Shore" will be guest co-hosts Sirius XM's Hits 1's Weekend Countdown.
- July 26:WYFJ slips down from the 100.1 frequency to 99.9, meaning the station will broadcast from Richmond instead of Ashland.
- July 26:During the finalizing of the sale of KSOX, it's been announced the station will flip to Spanish religion, and in the middle process will transit to Fox Sports.
- July 27:English ESPN KCUV transits to Spanish ESPN, while KXDP-LP changes from Spanish music to English ESPN.
- July 27:The request of a temporary restraining order against the acquisition of Emmis Communications has been denied by an Indiana judge.
- July 28: It was announced that WIFL would not flip formats, but change call letters to WOGF. The call letters will stand for "We're Ocala Gainesville Florida."
- July 28: WPEN-FM will start broadcasting Rutgers Scarlet Knights football in the autumn.
- July 28: "The Doug Banks Show" is picked up by American Urban Radio Networks, after several years on ABC and Citadel.
- July 30: Columbia, South Carolina, outlets WWNU and WWNQ will make changes; WWNU to drop Country for AC and become "Carolina 92.1," WWNQ to switch from Dial Global's Classic Hits satellite format to a local presentation and rebrand itself as "94.3 The River."
- July 30: Smooth/Urban AC WJZA and sister station, classic rock WODB, both of Columbus, Ohio, gave into another format today, 1980s Classic Hits. With this move, they now take on WNKO and WTDA, who use satellite programming from Dial Global for their Classic Hits format and "Gen X" newcomer WCGX
- July 30: Cumulus Media is sued by traffic reporting service Skywatch Traffic for breach of contract at a Cumulus station, Top 40 WNFN/Nashville. According to the lawsuit, the station had sold spots around reports, and when the station flipped from Sports Talk in 2009, they were never paid from the sponsors.
- August 1: WUIL flips to a classic rock format as "U-Rock 107.9".
- August 2: The Buffalo, New York, market gains its first adult standards station in four years, as WHLD/Niagara Falls adopts the format, dumping its previous brokered gospel format.
- August 2: WWDB/Philadelphia is set to cut loose business talk in favor of ESPN Deportes.
- August 2: Cumulus' Louisville outlets WQKC and WLCL quietly signed off. There is speculation that WLCL will be sold to Educational Media Foundation.
- August 2: WINK-TV launches an all-news format on WPTK/Fort Myers, Florida (which eventually takes the WINK callsign from what became WFSX), and WNPL/Naples, Florida.
- August 3: WVIA-FM will return to the airwaves after fire damaged their transmitter.
- August 3: Boxing ring announcer Michael Buffer sued El Paso station XHNZ-FM for using his trademark "Let's get ready to rumble" unlawfully.
- August 3: San Juan, Puerto Rico's WIAC gets the FCC thumbs up for changing their call letters to WTOK.
- August 3: The Dickey family who are behind Cumulus Media are nearing finalization of buying Modern Luxury Media, a magazine publisher.
- August 4: With the purchase of WSMR, University of South Florida will change two of their stations: WUSF will lean more towards news and information, and jazz overnight. WSMR is set to be a 24/7 classical station.
- August 5: WPLA/Jacksonville, Florida, dropped Alternative for AC-themed Oldies as "Magic 107.3"
- August 12: Urban AC WCMG/Florence, South Carolina, flips to Rock as "94.3 The Dam"
- August 16: CBS Radio's KKJJ in Las Vegas will drop the Jack FM format in favour of simulcasting AM news/talk KXNT.
- August 16: After 11 years as a Rhythmic Top 40 with very good ratings, WBTS/Atlanta becomes a simulcast of AM News/Talk sister station WSB. WBTS' format moves over to its HD2 channel and internet website.
- August 17: WGAR-FM in Cleveland abruptly fires longtime morning personality Jim Mantel; he had been a part of WGAR-FM's airstaff for over 18 1/2 years.
- August 19: Oldies returns to CKWS-FM/Kingston, Ontario, a format it had previously held as an AM station. The CRTC did not allow oldies on the FM dial until recently, requiring the station to air adult contemporary music when it switched from AM to FM.
- August 25: KNOX-FM/Grand Forks, North Dakota, drops Classic Rock for Top 40/CHR as "Z94.7."
- August 30: KHQG/Duluth, Minnesota, drops Classic Rock for Top 40/CHR as "102.5 KDWZ," reuniting the format with its former heritage dial position in the market when it was 102.5 KZIO in the 1980s and 1990s.
- August 30: After 29 years, DJ Larry Monroe hosts his last “Blue Monday” show on Austin's PBS station KUT
- August 31: WSJT dropped their instrumental covers, Urban AC and Soft AC hybrid format in favour of CHR. The station holds a new branding as Play 98.7."New 'Play' In Tampa Bay". RadioInk.com. Archived from the original on 2011-07-15.
- September 1: XHMORE-FM/Tijuana-San Diego revives its Rock en Espanol "More-FM" brand after a seven-year hiatus for Rhythmic Top 40 and Sports Talk, respectively.
- September 2: KIKI/Honolulu shifts from Rhythmic Top 40 to a "Gen-X" based Rhythmic AC direction. The move also puts them in competition with rival KUMU-FM.
- September 3: KTNI-FM Denver flipped from talk radio to urban oldies as "Jammin' 101.5".
- September 3: In Green Bay, Wisconsin, classic rock WOZZ flipped to Rock as "93 Rock" while sister station WROE picked up the classic rock format after dumping adult contemporary.
- September 3: WSGA/Savannah drops its "All '80s" format for current-based Adult Top 40
- September 6: WWLG/Atlanta drops Classic Country for a simulcast of Rhythmic Top 40 sister station WWVA-FM to cover the southern parts of the Atlanta area not covered by the latter. Both stations are later rebranded as "Wild 105.7 & 96.7" on November 14.
- September 6: KQIE/Riverside-San Bernardino, formerly licensed to Palm Springs as KDES, debuts with a Rhythmic Top 40 format
- September 10: Memphis picks up another Top 40/CHR, as Clear Channel launches KWNW.
- September 13: KOSP/Springfield, MO moves from 105.1 FM to 92.9 FM, and subsequently changes from "Star 105.1" to "Star 92.9." KOMG moves from 92.9 FM to 105.1 FM and the classic country format "Bass Country 92.9" is dropped for "Real Country Variety: 105.1 BOB-FM."
- September 13: Another influx of format flips: KDAL/Duluth drops Triple-A for Rock, while KUUB/Reno drops Country for Sports Talk but the Country format does find a new home at former Smooth Jazz outlet KJZS.
- September 14: WFAN's duo Boomer & Carton will add a TV simulcast on MSG Network.
- September 20: WHRL/Albany, New York, drops its modern rock format and adopts the call sign WGY-FM, simulcasting talk radio sister station WGY/Schenectady.
- September 20: WQNQ/Asheville, North Carolina, drops Adult Top 40 to Top 40/CHR as "Star 104.3."
- September 27: KDIF/Riverside-San Bernardino drops Spanish Oldies for All-Comedy and takes the call letters KFNY. They also become the first affiliate of the newly upstart 24/7 Comedy Radio Network
- September 29: Subaru of America becomes the first Japanese-based automaker in the US to offer HD radio and iTunes tagging in their vehicles, starting with the 2011 Forseter, which will be offered as an optional feature in its Premium level trim.
- October 1: WTWR-FM/Toledo drops its longtime Top 40/CHR format for AC as WMIM "My 98.3."
- October 4: Hybrid Country/Rock outlet WSDM/Terre Haute, Indiana, switched to Sport Talk and takes the ESPN Radio programming lineup from sister station WSDX, which will go off the air at end of the year
- October 5: ESPN Radio picks up a pair of new affiliates: former Adult Top 40 WZAT/Savannah and former Business Talk XEPE-AM/Tecate/San Diego
- October 6: KRZR/Fresno ditches Active Rock after two decades for a "Gen-X" type Rhythmic AC format as "103.7 The Beat." This puts them in competition with KMGV and KOKO.
- October 11: Clear Channel's Norfolk cluster makes changes, with Urban AC WKUS now a two-station simulcast with former Smooth Jazz WJCD and WKUS' former 105.3 frequency flipping to AC-leaning Classic Hits as "Magic 105.3."
- October 19: Oldies WSMM/South Bend becomes the first station in the United States, and the first station in 2010, to flip to All-Christmas music early
- October 19: Smooth AC CHMC/Edmonton flips to an AC format as up! 99.3.
- October 21: NPR fires commentator Juan Williams for making comments about Muslims during a segment on Fox News Channel's The O'Reilly Factor His firing has prompted several members of the United States Congress and Senate to call for NPR funding to be cut because of political bias
- October 31: The Raleigh-Durham radio market picks up its first Rhythmic Top 40, as Curtis Media launches the "Pulse 102" simulcast on WWPL/Smithfield and WPLW/Hillsborough
- November 1: WSRB/Chicago drops Urban AC for Talk, with the music now regulated to evenings and weekends.
- November 1: After nearly a year off the air, The Maxwell Show — formerly heard during afternoon drive on active rock station WMMS/Cleveland — returns as the new morning show on classic rock station WNCX/Cleveland.
- November 5: Adult CHR WMJC/Long Island flips to a Gen-X format as 94X, and another Great Forks station flips formats as KCNN flips to a Mainstream Rock format a year after flipping to Sports Talk.
- November 8: KVI/Seattle ends its 18-year run as a Conservative Talk outlet and returns to a full-service classic hits format.
- November 8: KHPT/Houston shifts from All-1980s to Classic Alternative as "106.9 The Zone."
- November 10: Just two days after KVI's return to Classic Hits, the "Gen-X" format enters the Puget Sound region, as Active Rock KFNK/Tacoma-Seattle becomes the latest convert.
- November 15: The Conservative Talk format finds a new home in Seattle, as KLFE drops Religious to become "Freedom 1590"
- November 15: After 7 months of Triple-A, KTKX/San Antonio flips to Classic Rock.
- November 18: Another Seattle station makes a formatic adjustment, as KQMV, the station that launched the "MOViN'" brand format, shifts from Adult-leaning Rhythmic Contemporary to Rhythmic-leaning Top 40/CHR
- November 20: After 5 years as an Active Rock outlet, WHDR/Miami drops the format and goes All-Christmas until a new format is unveiled, which is expected to be Soft AC as "Easy 93." Ironically, Rhythmic AC rival WMIA also jumps into the Christmas music fray at the same time, leading to more speculation over which one will flip to a new format first and vice versa.
- November 23: CHIQ/Winnipeg drops their Adult Top 40 format and starts stunting with Christmas music until a new format is unveiled
- November 24: Due to issues in which the FAA "had previously imposed a condition on the tower owner to coordinate any new frequencies on the tower," Connoisseur Communications cancels its CP for KGGG/Omaha and the FCC deletes the 107.7 FM frequency.
- November 24: KMVA/Phoenix drops Top 40/CHR and all references to its MOViN' identity for Christmas music. The station will flip to Adult Top 40 as "Hot 97.5" on December 25.
- November 24: XM Radio Canada and Sirius Canada announced that they will merge their services.
- December 1:Townsquare Media acquire 12 stations from New Northwest Broadcasting and places 6 of them in a divestment trust to comply with FCC market ownership limits.
- December 6: Two outlets return to their former formats, as WMOJ-FM/Cincinnati drops Urban AC for Rhythmic oldies again and KZZQ/Salt Lake City jettisons its hybrid Classic Rock/Hits experiment to revive its Active Rock and "The Blaze" identity
- December 10: Clear Channel Country outlet WMUS/Muskegon, Michigan, starts simulcasting Adult Top 40 sister station WSHZ as it prepares to make WMUS' current home at 106.9 a new home for the simulcast of News/Talk WOOD/Grand Rapids and move WMUS' calls and format to WSHZ's 107.9 signal.
- December 11: Top 40/CHR WIBT/Charlotte changes its moniker from "96.1 The Beat" to "Channel 96.1"
- December 14: just four days after it was announced that Clear Channel/Muskegon would replace WSHZ's Adult Top 40 format with WMUS' and its Country format, crosstown Sports Talk WEFG-FM drops the format to pick up WSHZ's former one as "Sunny 97.5." This marks the first time since 1996 that another station has used the "Sunny" moniker other than WSNX, whose call letters once matched that handle
- December 15: A pair of Clear Channel DJs were let go; Afternoon host John "Goumba Johnny" Sialiano from WKTU/New York City after 15 years and morning host Kevin "DreX" Buchar from WKSC/Chicago after 7 years.
- December 21: After 8 months as a "Gen X" outlet, KENZ returns to its former Alternative format and "apologizes" to its listeners for making a mistake in switching formats. They are the first station to drop the "All-90s" music format and the shortest as well.
- December 21: The National Football League extends its contract with Westwood One through the 2014 NFL season. It had previously been scheduled to end after 2011.
- December 22: WHEN/Syracuse drops Fox Sports Radio for urban adult contemporary, the same format as FM 106.9 WPHR. The change comes amid anticipation that WPHR will drop urban AC for a simulcast of news/talk WSYR-AM.
- December 23: Santa Barbara, California, picks up its first Top 40/CHR in nearly eight years, as KFYZ drops Spanish Adult Hits to fill the void, with emphasis on currents and upbeat party hits from 80s and 90s
- December 26: A flurry of format changes occur, as Gen X radio comes to St. Louis' WSDD, who joins the fray after a year as a Modern AC, Classic Hits KJR-FM/Seattle finishes stunting and rebrands as Oldies 95.7, CHFM/Calgary flips to Adult CHR as Lite 95.9, Fresno outlets Classic Hits KHIT-FM flipping to a Spanish AC format as Exitos 107.1 and Country KHGE rebrands as 102.7 The Wolf, Miami outlets WHDR finishing its Christmas stunting and unveils a Soft AC format as Easy 93.1, while WMIA flips back to Rhythmic Hot AC but keeps the 93.9 MIA moniker after a brief flirtation with Adult Top 40, CHIQ/Winnipeg going from Modern-leaning Adult Top 40 to Classic Hits as "Fab 94.3", KMVA/Phoenix changes brandings to Hot 97.5, KHUI/Honolulu drops Dial Global's satellite-fed Adult Standards for a simulcast of Christian Talk sister KGU, KPCH/Ruston flips to a Gen-X format as 99.3 X, and WCDD/Peoria flips to Country as CD Country 107.9.
- December 27: More format changes take place, as WNIO/Youngstown flips from Standards to Sports as 1390 WNIO The Sports Animal, WLMI/Lansing flips to Classic Hits, WCDY/Cadillac debuts a Hot AC format, WWGA/Carrollton flips to Classic Hits, WKLA-FM/Ludington flips to Oldies, WVHF/Great Rapids comes back on air with a Catholic format, WNIC/Detroit changes brandings to Fresh 100.3, KWJZ/Seattle flips to a Modern AC format as Click 98.9, and KEZK/St.Louis keeps the AC format, but rebrands as Fresh 102.5.
- December 28: KBDB/Reno drops Regional Mexican to join Broadcast Architecture's Smooth AC Network.
- December 29: WMVX/Cleveland drops Adult Top 40 and is stunting with a "Jack FM"-like format until January 2011.
- December 31: WEAE/Pittsburgh, Pennsylvania, an ESPN Radio owned-and-operated station, drops ESPN for another Disney-owned radio property, Radio Disney, which will move up from Birach Broadcasting's WWCS, KDOX/Las Vegas flips to Oldies as Kool 102, and KMVQ/San Francisco rebrands as 99.7 Now.

== Debuts ==
- February 1: The Seneca nation debuts its owned-and-operated for-profit radio station, WGWE.
- February: Red Eye Radio with Doug McIntyre debuts on Citadel Media. A weekend version hosted by Marc Germain debuts later that year.
- February: Donny Osmond debuts on Citadel Media.
- May 24: WITH/Ithaca, New York, a partnership of Hobart and William Smith Colleges (WEOS) and the WXXI Public Broadcasting Council, begins broadcasting.
- May 27: KLWB-FM/Opelousas, Louisiana, launches, serving Lafayette with a classic rock-leaning classic hits format moved from sister station KXKW.
- June 1: CIDG-FM, owned by Frank Torres, signs on in the Ottawa market.
- June 1: CJOT-FM, part of Astral Media's EZ Rock network, signs on in the Ottawa market, replacing the now-defunct CJEZ/Toronto (now classic hits CHBM) as the network flagship.
- June 12: Larry Kudlow debuts in syndication on Citadel Media, replacing the Saturday version of Moneytalk.
- September 10: "The Mike Posner Show," a hybrid music/sports lifestyle program hosted by the "Cooler Than Me" singer, will debut on Sirius XM's Faction

== Closings ==
- January 21: Air America Radio files for Chapter 7 bankruptcy and ceases operations effective immediately due to continuing financial losses.
- January 25: Conan O'Brien leaves The Tonight Show due to a time slot dispute. (Highlights from his shows were heard on Westwood One.)
- January 28: The FCC revokes the license of WHHO/Hornell, New York, for failure to pay a 2007 fine; owner Bilbat Radio cites WHHO's poor revenue for not paying the fine.
- January 29: Corus Entertainment takes CINW and CINF/Montreal off the air and return their licenses back to the CRTC
- February 12: Bill Handel quits his short-lived nationally syndicated afternoon show. The show had been used as a stop-gap after parent company Clear Channel lost the rights to Laura Schlessinger.
- February 13: The Timeless radio network is scheduled to be discontinued.
- February 19: After over 60 years, KSTN/Stockton, California, ceases operations.
- March 5: Bruce Williams retires, ending a 35-year career in radio.
- March 22: National Radio Network ceases operations.
- April 2: Joey Reynolds is canceled by WOR to make way for Coast to Coast AM. The show will resume on WNBC-DT2.
- April 26: The radio version of Morning Joe is placed on indefinite hiatus.
- May 11:Hamilton, Ohio, high school radio station WHSS will close, due to budget falls as well as declining career opportunities. The school board has yet to decide whether to sell the station, or to turn in the license to the FCC for cancellation.
- May 18: On May 28, 2010, longtime KTWV on-air personality Don Burns will no longer will be heard afternoons every weekday. His show had been voicetracked, the station says Burns will be replaced with a new and local host.
- May 31: WSVM/Valdese, North Carolina, ceases operations after nearly 49 years.
- June 1: Top 40 KVTI/Tacoma, Washington, ceased programming and started simulcasting Northwest Public Radio's Classical format. In addition, Clover Park Technical College, KVTI's owner, no longer offers radio broadcasting classes.
- June 7 : After 40 years of playing novelty songs on the airwaves, Dr. Demento announced that his program will end its syndication run at radio, but will continue on the internet
- June 9: Wendy Williams' radio program is cancelled by American Urban Radio Networks; Williams decision to continue with her TV talk show was cited as a factor.
- June 11: Non-commercial Dance outlet WMPH/Wilmington, Delaware, signs off the air due to budget cuts from the Brandywine School District. The programming continues online via the Dance Radio Network
- June 30:Bustos Media assigns NAP Broadcast Holding their stations, as well as John Bustos resigning. Bustos Media has 28 radio stations in states California, Idaho, Washington, Utah, and Wisconsin.
- August 4: WSMR in Sarasota, Florida will sign off.
- August 18: CJUL/Cornwall, Ontario, signs off the air after 10 years due to severe tower disrepair.
- August 23: WOYL/Oil City, Pennsylvania, is discovered to have ceased operations some time earlier that year.
- August 31: CHSC in St. Catharines, Ontario was ordered to sign off after the CRTC refuses to renew its license.
- August 31: Conservative Talk KMPH/Modesto, California, will sign off the air. Both financial losses and a struggling economy in the Modesto market played a factor in the decision
- September 1: WBGD/Brick, New Jersey, surrenders its license to the FCC after equipment failure and financial inability to repair it.
- September 10: Comerica Bank forecloses on KTRB/San Francisco (owned by the same company as KMPH) and puts the station into receiver ship. The Savage Nation is dropped and all employees are either fired or transferred to Oakland Athletics employment.
- September 30: WDDZ and WDZK, both Radio Disney owned-and-operated outlets, cease operations.
- October 22: Sirius XM Radio removes its Disco/Freestyle channel The Strobe from the lineup and places it online.
- November 1: God's Country Radio Network ceases operations after a fallout with Educational Media Foundation.
- November 19: Michael Smerconish leaves his nationally syndicated morning show in order to focus on his afternoon syndicated show and return to a local show (in afternoons) on WPHT.
- December 13: AC Nielsen shuts down its US radio rating service after two years
- December: Dr. Dean Edell announces his retirement from radio.
- December: Dr. Laura Schlessinger will no longer do a radio program, opting to retire and instead focus on writing. She made her decision on Larry King Live on August 17, 2010, just two weeks after she apologized for using racial slurs during her program. She will continue the show on Sirius XM.
- December 30: WBIS ceases operations. The move allows nearby WAGE to move closer to Washington, D.C., and take over WBIS's frequency.
- December 31: The Savage Nation's contract with Talk Radio Network expires. Host Michael Savage is in a legal dispute with the network over the terms of his contract.

== Deaths ==
- Terry Anderson. Radio host and anti-illegal immigration activist. Died July 7.
- Bob Blackburn, 83. Former play-by-play announcer for the Seattle SuperSonics. Died January 8.
- Tom Brookshier, 78. Philadelphia sports radio broadcaster and television commentator. Died January 29.
- Lawrence "Cool DJ Law" Brown, 40. Program Director and morning host at WOWI/Norfolk, Virginia. Died September 19.
- Shirley Bell Cole, 89. Voice of Little Orphan Annie on the radio series of the same name. Died January 12.
- Gary Coleman, 42 American child actor, politician and radio personality. Died May 28.
- Stanley Coning, ~86. Owner and sole operator of WCTM. Died December 24.
- Jimmy Dean, 81. Host of the radio-turned-TV show Town and Country Time, country singer and sausage entrepreneur. Died June 13.
- Fred Foy, 89. Radio announcer best known for his work on The Lone Ranger. Died December 22.
- Jan C. Gabriel, 69. Advertising voice best known for coining "Sunday! Sunday! Sunday!" Died January 10.
- Bingo Gazingo, 85. Cult poet who gained popularity through radio station WFMU. Died January 1.
- Bo Griffin, 51. American radio/television personality (Morning host at WPOW/Miami). Died February 17.
- Ernie Harwell, 92. Former play-by-play announcer for the Detroit Tigers. Died May 4.
- Cecil Heftel, 85. Politician and influential broadcaster/station owner in Hawaii and the Spanish-speaking community in the U.S. Died February 5.
- Jim Kelley, 61. Canadian-American hockey columnist and radio commentator in Buffalo and Toronto. Died November 30.
- Don Kent, 93. Pioneering radio and television meteorologist in the Boston area. Died March 2.
- Nellie King, 82. Former color commentator for the Pittsburgh Pirates. Died June 11.
- John Kluge, 92. Founder of the Metromedia radio and television company. Died September 7.
- Art Linkletter, 97. Canadian-American host of radio-turned-TV shows such as House Party and People Are Funny. Died May 26.
- Ron Lundy, 75. Former New York City disc jockey. Died March 15.
- Rory Markas, 54. Play-by-play announcer for the Los Angeles Angels of Anaheim. Died January 5.
- Don Meredith, 72. Owner-operator of WBUX in Pennsylvania; better known for his professional football and TV careers. Died December 5.
- Edwin Newman, 91. Radio broadcast journalist and presidential debate moderator. Died January 25.
- Dave Niehaus, 75. Play-by-play announcer for the Seattle Mariners since the team's debut. Died November 10.
- Charlie O'Donnell, 78. Philadelphia and New York disc jockey and television announcer. Died November 1.
- Neil Rogers, 68. Liberal talk radio host in the Miami market. Died December 24.
- Ron Santo, 70. Color commentator for the Chicago Cubs. Died December 2.
- Carl Smith, 82. Member of the Country Music Hall of Fame and 1950s-era host at WSM. Died January 16.
- Ralph Snodsmith, 70. Host of The Garden Hotline on WOR and the WOR Radio Network. Died April 17.
- Roy Steinfort, 88. Former director of the Associated Press's radio services. Died March 21.
