= KKEE =

KKEE may refer to:

- KKEE (FM), a radio station (101.3 FM) licensed to serve Centerville, Texas, United States
- KKOR, a radio station (1230 AM) licensed to serve Astoria, Oregon, United States, which held the call sign KKEE from 2001 to 2012
- KLMY, a radio station (99.7 FM) licensed to serve Long Beach, Washington, United States, which held the call sign KKEE from 1986 to 2001
