= KFLG =

KFLG may refer to:

- KFLG (AM), a radio station (1000 AM) licensed to Bullhead City, Arizona, United States
- KFLG-FM, a radio station (94.7 FM) licensed to Kingman, Arizona, United States
- The ICAO code for Flagstaff Pulliam Airport
