= KNKK =

- Needles, California; United States
- Frequency: 107.1 MHz
- Branding: The Knack

Programming
- Format: Contemporary hit radio–Pop music
- Affiliations: Premiere Networks

Ownership
- Owner: Cameron Broadcasting, Inc.
- Sister stations: KFLG, KFLG-FM, KLUK, KAAA, KZZZ

History
- First air date: 1997; 29 years ago
- Call sign meaning: Nack

Technical information
- Licensing authority: FCC
- Facility ID: 78087
- Class: C1
- ERP: 16,500 watts
- HAAT: 582 meters (1,909 ft)
- Transmitter coordinates: 35°1′58″N 114°21′57″W
- Translators: 95.1 K236AC (Lake Havasu City, Arizona); 96.7 K244CV (Kingman, Arizona); 99.3 K257FM (Laughlin, Nevada); 105.3 K297BL (Lake Havasu City, Arizona)

Links
- Public license information: Public file; LMS
- Website: theknack107.com

KNKK (107.1 FM, "The Knack") is a radio station broadcasting a Top 40 format. Licensed to Needles, California, United States, it serves the entire Tri-State area including Lake Havasu City, Kingman, Bullhead City/Laughlin and Needles. The station is currently owned by Cameron Broadcasting, Inc.
