= KVAS =

KVAS may refer to:

- KVAS-FM, a radio station (103.9 FM) licensed to serve Ilwaco, Washington, United States
- KKOR, a radio station (1230 AM) licensed to serve Astoria, Oregon, United States, which held the call sign KVAS from 1950 to 2001 and from 2012 to 2016
