= FRTA =

FRTA is an acronym which may refer to:

- Franklin Regional Transit Authority
- Federal Reserve Transparency Act
- Free Radical Theory of Aging
