= KLUK =

Radio station in Needles, California

- Needles, California; United States
- Broadcast area: Kingman, Lake Havasu, Laughlin, Bullhead City AZ/NV
- Frequency: 97.9 MHz
- Branding: Lucky 98 FM

Programming
- Format: Classic rock

Ownership
- Owner: Cameron Broadcasting, Inc.
- Sister stations: KFLG-FM, KNKK, KZZZ, KAAA, KFLG

History
- First air date: 1991 (as KWAZ)
- Former call signs: KJMM (1983–1984, CP); KWAZ (1984–1997); KNKK (1997–2000)
- Call sign meaning: K LUcKy 98

Technical information
- Licensing authority: FCC
- Facility ID: 8385
- Class: C1
- ERP: 29,500 watts
- HAAT: 475 meters (1,558 ft)
- Transmitter coordinates: 35°2′4″N 114°22′12″W
- Translators: 104.1 K281DK (Lake Havasu City, Arizona); 107.5 K298DI (Kingman, Arizona); 107.9 K300CQ (Lake Havasu City, Arizona)

Links
- Public license information: Public file; LMS
- Webcast: Listen Live
- Website: lucky98fm.com

KLUK (97.9 FM, "Lucky 98") is a radio station broadcasting a classic rock format. Licensed to Needles, California, United States, it serves the entire "Tri-State area" including Lake Havasu, Kingman, Laughlin/Bullhead City and Needles, California. The station is currently owned by Cameron Broadcasting, Inc. and features TnT Radio Empire, Star in The Afternoon, and Poorman's Morning Rush. Lucky 98 FM is the only live and local classic rock station in the area.

== Translators ==
KLUK also broadcasts on the following translators:

Broadcast translators for KLUK
Call sign	Frequency	City of license	FID	ERP (W)	Class	FCC info
K281DK	104.1 FM	Lake Havasu City, Arizona	67363	250	D	LMS
K298DI	107.5 FM	Kingman, Arizona	9036	99	D	LMS
K300CQ	107.9 FM	Lake Havasu City, Arizona	147834	10	D	LMS
