= KXDD =

KXDD may refer to:

- KXDD (FM), a radio station (104.1 FM) licensed to serve Yakima, Washington, United States
- KXDF-CD, a low-power television station (channel 13) licensed to serve Fairbanks, Alaska, United States, which held the call sign KXDD-CD from November to December 2016
