= KCRX-FM =

- Seaside, Oregon; United States
- Broadcast area: Astoria, Oregon
- Frequency: 102.3 MHz
- Branding: 102.3 KCRX

Programming
- Format: Classic rock

Ownership
- Owner: New Northwest Broadcasters, LLC
- Sister stations: KAST, KLMY, KKOR, KVAS-FM

History
- First air date: 1998 (as KULU)
- Former call signs: KULU (1995–2000)

Technical information
- Licensing authority: FCC
- Facility ID: 33946
- Class: C3
- ERP: 10,500 watts
- HAAT: 121.8 meters
- Transmitter coordinates: 45°57′10″N 123°56′18″W

Links
- Public license information: Public file; LMS
- Webcast: Listen live
- Website: 1023kcrx.com

KCRX-FM (102.3 FM) is a radio station broadcasting a Classic rock format. Licensed to Seaside, Oregon, United States. The station is currently owned by New Northwest Broadcasters, LLC.

== History ==
The station was assigned the call sign KULU on October 6, 1995. On August 28, 2000, the station changed its call sign to KCRX-FM.
