= Campaign for Liberty =

American political organization

Coordinates: 38.8106°N 77.2217°W

- Founded: June 10, 2008
- Founder: Ron Paul
- Type: Public, 501(c)(4)
- Purpose: Educate Americans in freedom, sound money, non-interventionism, free markets, and related positions of candidates at all levels of government.
- Location(s): 5211 Port Royal Road; Springfield, Virginia
- Region served: United States
- Members: 650,000+
- Key people: Ron Paul, Chairman; Norm Singleton, President; John McCardell, Executive Director; Heather Danielowski, Director of State Operations
- Website: CampaignForLiberty.org

The Campaign for Liberty (C4L) is a political organization founded by twelve-term United States Congressman Ron Paul. Campaign for Liberty focuses on educating elected officials and the general public about constitutional issues, and currently provides a membership program. Its legal status is that of a 501(c)(4) nonprofit.

The Campaign for Liberty was announced on June 12, 2008, as a way of continuing the grassroots support involved in Ron Paul's 2008 presidential run, and corresponded with the suspension of that campaign. Paul formally announced during the Texas Republican Convention that he had created this new organization known as the "Campaign for Liberty".

On August 5, 2015, C4L Chairman John Tate was indicted by a federal grand jury for felony charges arising from an alleged cover-up. Tate, and colleagues on the 2012 Ron Paul presidential campaign, conducted to conceal the expenditure of campaign money to buy the endorsement of an Iowa politician. In October 2015, Tate was acquitted of all charges.

== Purpose ==
According to Ron Paul, the purpose of the Campaign for Liberty is to continue the principles that invoked the grassroots support of his campaign, and to also be able to continue the message that he promoted during the course of his bid, without having a presidential campaign, and is also intended to "lay the groundwork for a different America." Paul also noted,

The time has come to act on these words. May future generations look back on our work and say that these were men and women who, in a moment of great crisis, stood up to the politicians, the opinion-molders, and the establishment, and saved their country.

It was also established as a reporting agency for news involved with the principles of the organization.

== Political advocacy ==
=== Audit the Federal Reserve ===
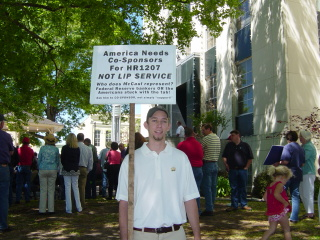
A C4L member shows support for HR 1207 at a local gathering

Campaign for Liberty's first major policy initiative involves pushing support for HR 1207, a bill that calls for more transparency of the Federal Reserve. Also called the Federal Reserve Transparency Act of 2009, HR 1207 was introduced in the U.S. House of Representatives of the 111th United States Congress by Campaign For Liberty's Honorary Chairman, Congressman Ron Paul (TX-14). The bill proposed a full audit of the Federal Reserve System (the "Fed") before the end of 2010. As of May 25, 2010, it had 319 cosponsors and has been referred to the Committee on Financial Services.

The bill was reintroduced in the 112th Congress by Congressman Ron Paul. The Federal Reserve Transparency Act passed the House of Representatives on July 25, 2012, by a margin of 327–98. At the time of passage, the bill had 274 co-sponsors. Harry Reid refused to bring the Senate version, S.202, introduced by Senator Rand Paul, up for a vote.

H.R 24, "Ron Paul's Audit the Fed" was introduced in the House on January 3, 2013 by Congressman Paul Broun of Georgia. As of April 15, 2013, the bill has 142 co-sponsors. An identical bill, S.209, was introduced in the Senate by Senator Rand Paul. As of April 15, 2013, the bill has 24 co-sponsors.

=== Internet freedom ===
Campaign for Liberty has lobbied against CISPA and SOPA/PIPA. Campaign for Liberty is opposed to the Marketplace Fairness Act and has urged its members to lobby against it.

== Liberty Political Action Conference ==
The Liberty Political Action Conference (LPAC) is a conference held by Campaign for Liberty once a year. At the event, Campaign for Liberty trains its members with the newest campaign and political activism techniques.

== Past events ==
=== Rally for the Republic ===
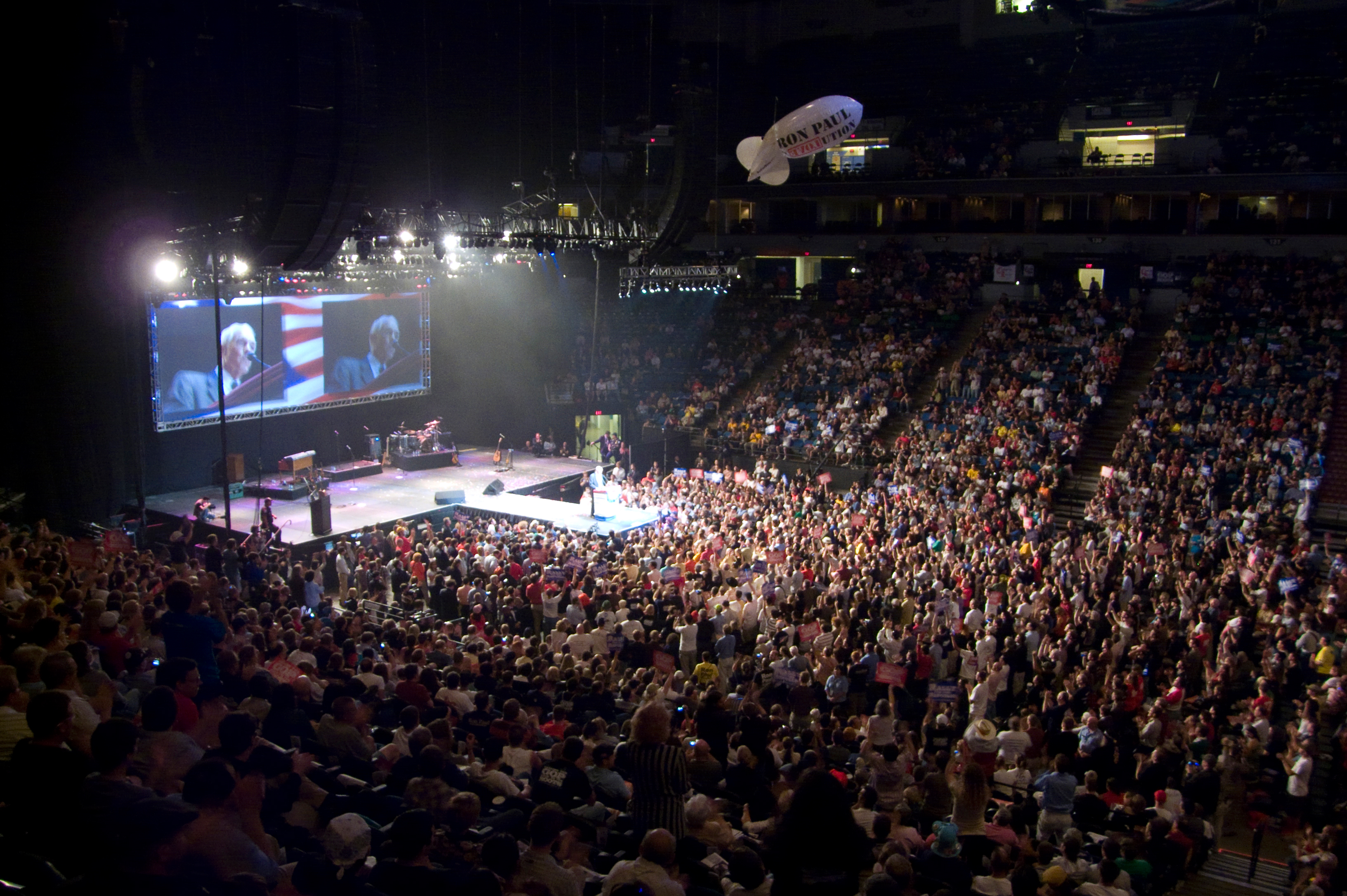
The "Rally for the Republic"

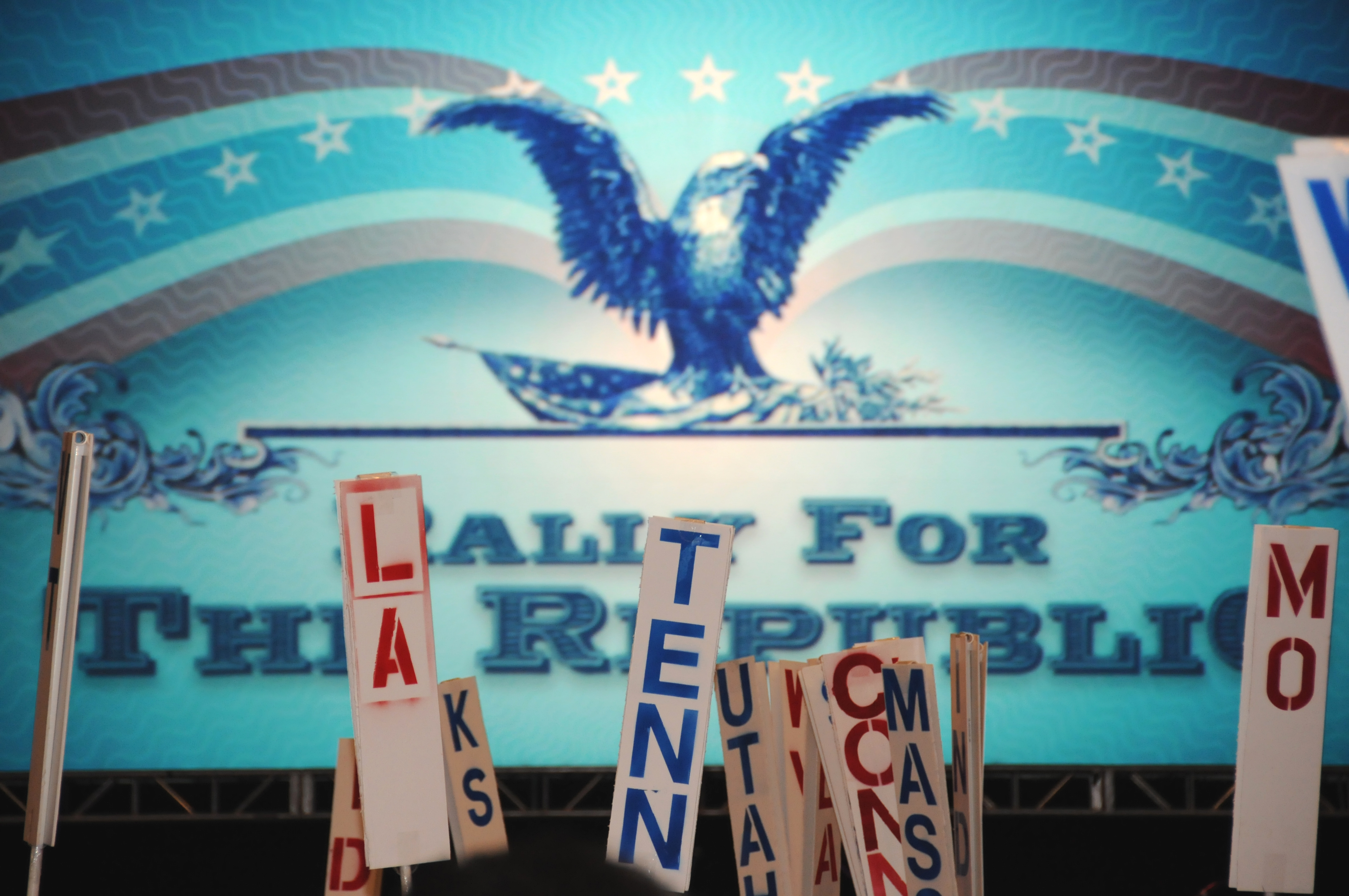
The "Rally for the Republic" insignia, from the convention floor

On June 10, 2008, the Ron Paul Campaign announced the first promotional event for the organization, a "Rally for the Republic". After not being offered a speaking slot at the Republican convention, Ron Paul, who did not support GOP nominee John McCain, decided to stage his own parallel convention in Minneapolis. This event occurred at the Target Center on September 2, 2008, which was the second day of the GOP Convention. On July 22, 2008, the event's official website launched, which provided details of the Rally, and of other events which were to occur in the same week including a leadership summit, book signing, and free concert. Notable attendees were announced, including the Rally's emcee, MSNBC's Tucker Carlson, former Governor Jesse Ventura, Governor Gary Johnson, Barry Goldwater Jr., Bruce Fein, Howard Phillips, Thomas Woods, Bill Kauffman, Erik Vendt, Grover Norquist, Lew Rockwell, Barb Davis White and Doug Wead. Country music star Sara Evans and singer/songwriter Aimee Allen headlined the musical portion of the event. On September 1, more than 10,000 tickets were sold out. Most of the rally was broadcast live on C-SPAN 2 and a live stream was set up on the Campaign for Liberty website.

According to the Rally's official website, its purpose was to "be a celebration of our movement and our supporters, a launch party for the Campaign for Liberty, and a clear call to the Republican Party to return to its roots of limited government, personal responsibility, and protection of our natural rights. The event ran in conjunction with the first two days of the Republican National Convention and featured top conservative speakers, musicians, and organizations. It also had an organizational and training function for the Campaign for Liberty and the Freedom Movement." Much of the press of the event referred to the rally as a "counter-convention".

=== Regional conferences ===
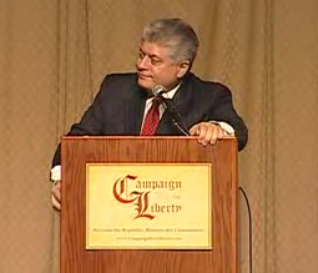
Judge Andrew Napolitano speaks in St. Louis

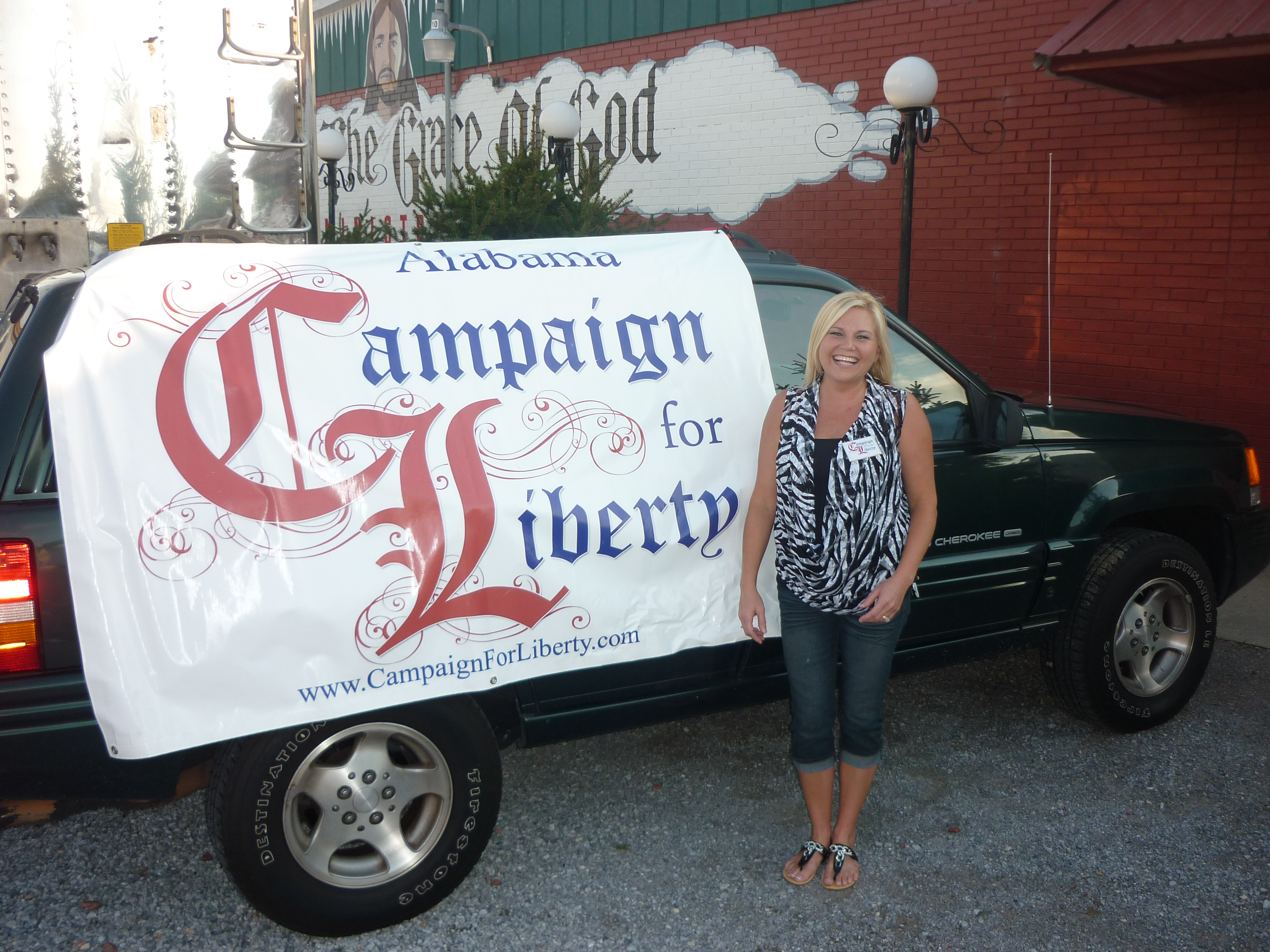
Barbara Hall, Alabama C4L Regional Coordinator, at a Chilton County event.

On October 26, 2008, Don Rasmussen, the former Director of Operations for Campaign for Liberty said the organization was planning a series of regional summits throughout 2009. Matt Hawes, Vice President of Programs, later announced that the C4L would hold these events throughout the country.

The first of these regional conferences was held on March 27–29, 2009, in St. Louis, Missouri. Ron Paul, Judge Andrew Napolitano, and staff members from C4L and Young Americans for Liberty spoke. Other activities included grassroots training sessions in addition to a lecture by historian and author Thomas E. Woods, Jr.

Campaign for Liberty held another conference on May 22–24, 2009, at the Doubletree Hotel in Seattle, Washington.

On July 10–12, 2009 Campaign for Liberty members gathered at Bally's in Las Vegas, Nevada, for the next regional conference where they were able to "network, learn, and build their local organizations as our grassroots Revolution to reclaim our Republic and restore our Constitution continues." This event ran in conjunction with the annual Freedom Fest which features over 100 libertarian-minded speakers. Thomas E. Woods, Jr. and Ron Paul were joined by economist Mark Skousen for the C4L event.

On September 17–19, C4L held its next regional conference right outside Philadelphia, Pennsylvania at the Valley Forge Convention Center. This event included two rallies, each attended by several hundred activists. On opening night, the "Freedom Celebration" featured Dr. Ron Paul, the American Conservative Defense Alliance's Phil Giraldi, New Jersey State Assemblyman Mike Doherty, and Ron Paul's son and C4L board member, Ronnie Paul. On Friday, attendees received political training, and then Judge Andrew Napolitano delivered speech about the problems with the PATRIOT Act. The conference concluded on Saturday with an "Economic Liberty Symposium", which featured author Thomas E. Woods, Jr., broker and Senate Candidate Peter Schiff, and British MEP Daniel Hannan.

C4L held the next regional conference in Atlanta, Georgia, on January 15–17, 2010. It was held at the Sheraton in Atlanta and brought supporters from Georgia, North Carolina, South Carolina, Tennessee, Florida, Alabama, and many more states. Speakers included Congressman Ron Paul, Thomas Woods, Lew Rockwell, and Thomas DiLorenzo.
