= KFLG-FM =

Coordinates: 34.552°N 114.194°W

- Big River, California; United States
- Broadcast area: Kingman, Lake Havasu City, Laughlin, Bullhead City, Arizona/Nevada
- Frequency: 94.7 MHz
- Branding: Country K-FLAG

Programming
- Format: Country
- Affiliations: Premiere Networks

Ownership
- Owner: Cameron Broadcasting, Inc.
- Sister stations: KLUK, KNKK, KZZZ, KAAA, KFLG (AM)

History
- First air date: 1974 (as KZZZ-FM)
- Former call signs: KZZZ-FM (1974–2000)
- Call sign meaning: K-FLaG

Technical information
- Licensing authority: FCC
- Facility ID: 55495
- Class: C0
- ERP: 19,500 watts
- HAAT: 834 meters (2,736 ft)
- Translators: 95.9 K240CL (Bullhead City, Arizona); 106.7 K294BU (Kingman, Arizona)

Links
- Public license information: Public file; LMS
- Website: kflg947.com

KFLG-FM (94.7 MHz) is a radio station broadcasting a country music format. Licensed to Big River, California, United States, it serves the entire Tri-State area including Lake Havasu City; Kingman, Arizona; Needles, California; Laughlin, Nevada; and Bullhead City, Arizona. The station is currently owned by Cameron Broadcasting, Inc.

== History ==
The station began broadcasting as KZZZ in 1974 The station was sold to Cameron Broadcasting in 2001 and the format changed from Adult Contemporary (Sunny 94.7) to Country. On December 31, 2000, the station changed its call sign to the current KFLG-FM. KFLG-FM had been in the Tri-State market for some years operating on 102.7. When that frequency moved to Las Vegas, its calls were reassigned to 94.7; the KZZZ designation is now a part of the "All Talk From A to Z Network" on 1490 kHz from Bullhead City.

Prior to 1982, the call sign KFLG was used by the station currently known as KAFF-FM, which operates on 92.9 MHz and is licensed to the Guyann Corporation to serve Flagstaff, Arizona. The station operated with an Adult Contemporary format in the late 1970s and early 1980s.
