= New Northwest Broadcasters =

Former radio broadcasting company of the United States

New Northwest Broadcasters, headquartered in Bellevue, Washington, operated 38 radio stations in seven cities in the Pacific Northwest and Alaska. Prior to the company's bankruptcy, its stations were located in Alaska (Anchorage and Fairbanks), Montana (Billings), Oregon (Astoria and Klamath Falls), and Washington (Yakima).

== Stations owned ==
=== Anchorage, Alaska ===
- KDBZ 102.1
- KFAT 92.9
- KBBO-FM 92.1
- KXLW 96.3

=== Astoria, Oregon ===
- KAST 1370
- KJOX-FM 99.7

=== Billings, Montana ===
In 2009, New Northwest spun its Billings cluster off to company president and CEO Pete Benedetti.

- KGHL 790
- KGHL-FM 98.5
- KRSQ 101.9
- KQBL 105.1
- KRPM 107.5

=== Fairbanks, Alaska ===
- KCBF 820
- KFAR 660
- KXLR 95.9
- KTDZ 103.9
- KWLF 98.1

=== Yakima, Washington ===
- KARY-FM 100.9
- KJOX 1390
- KHHK 99.7
- KBBO 980
- KRSE 105.7
- KXDD 104.1

== See also ==
- List of radio stations in Alaska
- List of radio stations in Montana
- List of radio stations in Oregon
- List of radio stations in Washington (state)
