= Federal Reserve Transparency Act =

Legislation to audit the U.S. central bank's monetary policy decisions

The Federal Reserve Transparency Act is a series of bills introduced at various times in the U.S. House of Representatives and Senate since 2009 by Congressmen Ron Paul, Bernie Sanders, Paul Broun, and Thomas Massie. It included proposals for a reformed audit of the Federal Reserve System (the "Fed").

The original version of the bill, (H.R. 1207), was proposed by now retired Congressman Ron Paul in response to the 2008 financial crisis during the 111th United States Congress. The Senate version was introduced by Bernie Sanders (I-VT). (S. 604). Ron Paul was disappointed with the Senate's version of the bill, stating it "guts the spirit of a truly meaningful audit of the most crucial transactions of the Fed".

The bill was subsequently brought up in the 112th United States Congress as (H.R. 459) /S. 202 and in the 113th United States Congress as (H.R. 24)/S. 209. All three previous attempts passed in the House of Representatives but died in the Senate.

== Purpose ==
According to its short title, the Federal Reserve Transparency Act of 2009 (H.R. 1207) would have amended Title 31 of the United States Code "to reform the manner in which the Board of Governors of the Federal Reserve System is audited by the Comptroller General of the United States and the manner in which such audits are reported". It would have stricken exceptions to the audit protocol in 31 U.S.C. § 714 for the Federal Reserve System, the central bank of the United States, and would have replaced an indefinite deadline with a deadline of December 2010. If enacted, the bill would also have ensured that the audit results would be available to Congress. The audit would include the Fed's "discount window", its funding facilities, its open market operations, and its agreements with foreign bankers.

The Board of Governors of the Federal Reserve System has stated that "the financial statements of the Federal Reserve Banks and the Board of Governors are audited annually by an independent outside auditor." The bill's sponsor, Congressman Ron Paul (R-TX), countered by stating that the present audit process exempts the Fed's "most crucial activities".

== Legislative history ==
Congress	Short title	Bill number(s)	Date introduced	Sponsor(s)	# of cosponsors	Latest status
111th Congress	Federal Reserve Transparency Act of 2009	H.R. 1207	February 26, 2009	Ron Paul (R-TX)	320	Died in committee
111th Congress	Federal Reserve Transparency Act	S. 513	March 3, 2009	Bernie Sanders (I-VT)	2	Died in committee
112th Congress	Federal Reserve Transparency Act of 2012	H.R. 459	January 26, 2011	Ron Paul (R-TX)	274	Passed House (327–98)
112th Congress	Federal Reserve Transparency Act	H.R. 1496	April 12, 2011	Ron Paul (R-TX)	0	Died in committee
112th Congress	Federal Reserve Transparency Act of 2011	S. 202	January 26, 2011	Rand Paul (R-KY)	37	Died in committee
113th Congress	Federal Reserve Transparency Act of 2014	H.R. 24	January 3, 2013	Paul Broun (R-GA)	228	Passed House (333-92)
113th Congress	Federal Reserve Transparency Act of 2013	S. 209	February 4, 2013	Rand Paul (R-KY)	32	Died in committee
114th Congress	Federal Reserve Transparency Act of 2015	H.R. 24	January 6, 2015	Thomas Massie (R-KY)	201	Died in committee
114th Congress	Federal Reserve Transparency Act of 2015	S. 264	January 27, 2015	Rand Paul (R-KY)	34	Died in committee
114th Congress	Federal Reserve Transparency Act of 2015	S. 2232	November 3, 2015	Rand Paul (R-KY)	26	Died in committee
115th Congress	Federal Reserve Transparency Act of 2017	H.R. 24	January 3, 2017	Thomas Massie (R-KY)	114	Died in committee
115th Congress	Federal Reserve Transparency Act of 2017	S. 16	January 3, 2017	Rand Paul (R-KY)	16	Died in committee
116th Congress	Federal Reserve Transparency Act of 2019	H.R. 24	January 3, 2019	Thomas Massie (R-KY)	102	Died in committee
116th Congress	Federal Reserve Transparency Act of 2019	S. 148	January 16, 2019	Rand Paul (R-KY)	8	Died in committee
117th Congress	Federal Reserve Transparency Act of 2021	H.R. 24	January 4, 2021	Thomas Massie (R-KY)	57	Died in committee
117th Congress	Federal Reserve Transparency Act of 2021	S. 573	March 3, 2021	Rand Paul (R-KY)	7	Died in committee
118th Congress	Federal Reserve Transparency Act of 2023	H.R. 24	January 9, 2023	Thomas Massie (R-KY)	72	Died in committee
118th Congress	Federal Reserve Transparency Act of 2023	S. 3566	January 10, 2024	Rand Paul (R-KY)	10	Died in committee
119th Congress	Federal Reserve Transparency Act of 2025	H.R. 24	January 3, 2025	Thomas Massie (R-KY)	46	Referred to committee
119th Congress	Federal Reserve Transparency Act of 2025	S. 2327	July 17, 2025	Rand Paul (R-KY)	6	Referred to committee

== House ==
Representative Paul introduced the bill to the U.S. House of Representatives of the 111th Congress on February 26, 2009, at which point it was referred to the Committee on Financial Services. Its 11 original cosponsors were Neil Abercrombie (D-HI), Michele Bachmann (R-MN), Roscoe Bartlett (R-MD), Paul Broun (R-GA), Dan Burton (R-IN), Walter B. Jones (R-NC), Steve Kagen (D-WI), Ted Poe (R-TX), Bill Posey (R-FL), Denny Rehberg (R-MT), and Lynn Woolsey (D-CA).

He immediately promoted the bill at the annual Conservative Political Action Conference (CPAC) on February 27. Paul charges the Federal Open Market Committee with being "less than transparent" with its secret meetings. In an April 2009 editorial, Paul thanked the Fed for its responsive attempt to enhance transparency and accountability, but called it "window dressing at best, and it's utterly useless at worst".

=== Progress ===

As the 111th Congress drew to its close in December 2010, H.R. 1207 had 320 cosponsors, including all House Republicans, as well as over 100 Democrats, suggesting broad bipartisan support. Dennis Kucinich (D-OH) became the 218th sponsor as listed at THOMAS.gov on June 11; 218 votes are needed to pass any bill in the House, and 290 were needed for a veto-proof majority. Barney Frank (D-MA), Chairman of the House Committee on Financial Services through which the bill must pass, finally endorsed the bill in August following months of silence. Frank later reversed his position on the bill after the Watt amendment was rejected and Watt's revisions undone by an amendment co-sponsored by Paul and Alan Grayson (D-FL).

=== Amendment to Financial Stability Improvement Act of 2009 (HR 3996) ===
On November 19, 2009, the Committee on Financial Services approved the Paul-Grayson amendment to the Financial Stability Improvement Act of 2009 (H.R. 3996). The amendment includes many provisions of the Federal Reserve Transparency Act, including removing GAO audit restrictions and allowing a more complete audit of the Federal Reserve, including reviewing various policies and agreements with foreign entities. It was passed by in a 43–26 vote, with bipartisan support despite opposition from former supporter and Committee Chairman Barney Frank. The amendment was also opposed by Federal Reserve Chairman Ben Bernanke, Treasury Secretary Tim Geithner and others from the Obama administration.

Frank declined to vote for the final amendment after proposed changes made by fellow Democrat Melvin Watt representing North Carolina's 12th congressional district, which encompasses most of Bank of America hometown Charlotte, were stripped out in favor of the amendment's original language by the amendment proposed by Paul and Grayson. Watt's proposed version included provisions that allowed audits of the Fed's balance sheet, but not for the monetary policy. Ryan Grim, a contributor for the left-leaning news blog The Huffington Post suggested Watt's amendment was an attempt to create less transparency than before at the Federal Reserve.

=== Passage by the House ===
The Financial Stability Improvement Act was combined, along with several other bills from the same committee, into The Wall Street Reform and Consumer Protection Act of 2009 - Financial Stability Improvement Act of 2009 (H.R. 4173). The House passed the new bill on December 11, 2009, on a vote of 223–202. The vote was mostly along party lines, with no Republicans voting for the bill. Paul, objecting to some of the provisions of the combined bill, voted against passage despite the inclusion of the audit provisions he had been proposing for years.

== Senate ==

On March 16, 2009, U.S. Senator Bernie Sanders (I-VT) introduced the Senate companion version, S. 604, the Federal Reserve Sunshine Act of 2009, with the same provisions. This version was then referred to the Committee on Banking, Housing, and Urban Affairs. The bill had 32 co-sponsors as of 01/28/2010.

=== Senate Amendment 1367 ===
On July 6, 2009, U.S. Senator Jim DeMint attempted to amend HR 2918, the Legislative Branch Appropriations Act by adding the entire text of S. 604 as Senate Amendment 1367. However, U.S. Senator Ben Nelson stopped the amendment by claiming it violated Senate Rule 16, by "legislating" on an appropriations bill. The Senate president agreed, but when challenged by DeMint, admitted that many other GAO audits in the bill also violated Rule 16, but took no action. The bill passed without further changes.

== Related legislation ==
The two titles for these two versions of the bill are not to be confused with the same two titles (used in reverse) for the two versions of a related bill. The House "Federal Reserve Sunshine Act of 2009" by Paul (H.R. 1348), and the Senate "Federal Reserve Transparency Act of 2009" by Sanders (S. 513), require the Federal Reserve to publish information on financial assistance provided to various entities during the 2008 bailout. This bill creates a website listing all banks that have borrowed from the Fed since March 24, 2008, and the amount, terms, and "specific rationale" of the loans. Sanders commented, "I have a hard time understanding how you have put $2.2 trillion at risk without making those names available." Fed chair Ben Bernanke had told Sanders that publishing the names would make the banks feel stigmatized and potentially reluctant to borrow further. There was also a bill introduced in the 116th Congress called the Federal Reserve Sunshine Act of 2020 by Congressman Mark Green (TN-07). This bill would rescind the CARES Act provision that allows the Federal Reserve's Board of Governors to conduct meetings without complying with federal open records laws.

== Criticism ==
Senator Judd Gregg called the Paul-Grayson amendment "pandering to populism", saying the audit requirements would be detrimental to monetary policy. Gregg added that "It's great PR; you go home and beat up the Fed."

"I strongly oppose Audit the Fed," said Federal Reserve chief Janet Yellen, saying that it would "bring short-term political pressures to bear" on the central bank and dissuade it from making the "hard choices" needed to curb inflation. The central bank's chair, in opposing the idea, said it would "politicize monetary policy."

== Advocacy ==
Support for the Federal Reserve Transparency Act of 2009 was one of the issues raised as part of the nationwide 2009 Tea Party protests. During an episode of the Glenn Beck program which broadcast April 15 from a rally at the Alamo in San Antonio, Pat Gray interviewed a local supporter of the Transparency Act, drawing cheers from the crowd.

Support for the bill has also come from those on the left outside of Congress. In a letter to Chairman Barney Frank of the House Financial Services Committee, Ranking Member Spencer Bachus and its members, several progressives such as bloggers Jane Hamsher of Firedoglake, Yves Smith of Naked Capitalism, author Naomi Klein, labor leaders President Richard Trumka of the AFL–CIO, the SEIU's President Andy Stern, the United Steelworkers's President Leo Gerard, economists Dean Baker, James K. Galbraith, Rob Johnson, and professors William K. Black, Thomas Ferguson, and L. Randall Wray, pushed for passage of the bill and against the adoption of the amendment proposed by Rep. Watt.

The advocacy group Campaign for Liberty (CFL) encourages members to petition representatives to cosponsor the Transparency Act. College Republicans at Appalachian State University, staged a Boston Tea Party themed assembly for tax day 2009, to raise awareness for the Transparency Act; the event included wearing white wristbands to symbolize slavery and mailing tea bags to state representatives. CFL president John Tate promotes the bill in conjunction with dealing with "the silent, destructive tax of monetary inflation", this thought was echoed in the Kansas City Star. Ron Paul, Andrew Napolitano, and state representative Jim Guest promoted the bill "at length" at the crowded first CFL regional conference in St. Louis, Missouri (March 27–29), affirming Americans' "right to know where their tax dollars are going, especially those going to companies from the stimulus package". Pro-gambling group Gambling911.com is also interested in the Transparency Act, as an opportunity to audit the Federal Reserve, and also promoted the CFL "Freedom Celebration" regional conference.

Donald Trump while campaigning for the 2016 presidential Republican nomination has stated that he supports Audit the Fed.

== See also ==
- Federal Reserve Board Abolition Act (H.R. 833)
- Free Competition in Currency Act (H.R. 4248)
