= KHHK =

Radio station in Yakima, Washington

Coordinates: 46.522°N 120.337°W

- Yakima, Washington; United States
- Frequency: 99.7 MHz (HD Radio)
- Branding: Hot 99.7

Programming
- Format: Rhythmic contemporary
- Subchannels: HD2: Hot AC "Big 106.1"; HD3: Oldies (KTCR simulcast); HD4: Sports (KBBO simulcast)

Ownership
- Owner: Stephens Media Group; (SMG-Yakima, LLC)
- Sister stations: KARY-FM; KBBO; KRSE; KTCR; KXDD

History
- First air date: 1985
- Former call signs: KAJR-FM (1985–1987); KIHS (1987–1992); KZTA-FM (1992–1996)
- Call sign meaning: K H Hot YaKima

Technical information
- Licensing authority: FCC
- Facility ID: 36031
- Class: C3
- ERP: 4,100 watts
- HAAT: 245 meters (804 ft)
- Translators: HD2: 106.1 K291BV (Wapato); HD3: 106.9 K295BT (Wapato); HD4: 104.5 K283BX (Wapato)

Links
- Public license information: Public file; LMS
- Webcast: Listen live; HD2: Listen live
- Website: newhot997.com gobig1061.com (HD2)

KHHK (99.7 FM) is a radio station in Yakima, Washington, United States. Owned by Stephens Media Group, the station airs a rhythmic contemporary format.

== History ==
On May 26, 2010, it was rumored KHHK's parent company New Northwest Broadcasters's stations could possibly be sold in the near future. Principal of Revitalization Partners, Alan Davis says "The stations are on the air; it’s business as usual. I can only tell you there appears to be demand for the stations." In 2012, the stations were sold to James Ingstad of Fargo, North Dakota. In April 2018, it was in turn sold to Stephens Media Group.
