= KTCR (AM) =

Radio station in Selah, Washington

- Selah, Washington; United States
- Broadcast area: Yakima, Washington
- Frequency: 980 kHz
- Branding: Kruzn 106.9 KTCR

Programming
- Format: Oldies

Ownership
- Owner: Stephens Media Group; (SMG-Yakima, LLC)
- Sister stations: KHHK, KRSE, KXDD, KARY-FM, KBBO

History
- First air date: 1955 (as KUTI)
- Former call signs: KUTI (1955–1996); KCHT (1996–1997); KJOX (1997–2004); KBBO (2004–2013)

Technical information
- Licensing authority: FCC
- Facility ID: 7918
- Class: B
- Power: 5,000 watts day 500 watts night
- Transmitter coordinates: 46°38′24.5″N 120°35′52.2″W
- Translator: 102.5 K273DK (Yakima)
- Repeater: 99.7 KHHK-HD3 (Yakima)

Links
- Public license information: Public file; LMS
- Webcast: Listen Live
- Website: kruznktcr.com

KTCR (980 kHz, "Kruzn 106.9 KTCR") is an AM radio station licensed to Selah, Washington. Owned by Stephens Media Group, it broadcasts an oldies format.

== History ==
The station went on air as KUTI in 1955.

In 1983 KUTI changed its city of license from Yakima to Selah in order to increase power and add nighttime service.

On May 26, 2010, it was rumored then-KJOX's parent company New Northwest Broadcasters's stations could possibly be sold in the near future. Principal of Revitalization Partners, Alan Davis says "The stations are on the air; it's business as usual. I can only tell you there appears to be demand for the stations." In 2012, the stations were sold to James Ingstad of Fargo, North Dakota.

On August 29, 2013, KTCR and its classic country format moved to 980 AM, swapping frequencies with talk-formatted KBBO.

On May 25, 2015, KTCR flipped to a Spanish-language sports talk format as part of the ESPN Deportes Radio network.

In April 2018, Ingstad Radio sold 14 of its stations in Yakima and the Tri-Cities to Stephens Media Group.

On September 2, 2019, with the looming shutdown of ESPN Deportes Radio, the station returned to English-language music programming by flipping to oldies Kruzn 106.9. The station is simulcast on FM translators 102.5 K273DK and 106.9 K295BT (which itself flipped from active rock The X), and simulcast on KKHK-HD3.
