= KARY-FM =

Radio station in Grandview, Washington

- Grandview, Washington; United States
- Broadcast area: Yakima, Washington
- Frequency: 100.9 MHz
- Branding: 100.9 Cherry FM

Programming
- Format: Classic hits

Ownership
- Owner: Stephens Media Group; (SMG-Yakima, LLC)
- Sister stations: KBBO, KHHK, KRSE, KTCR, KXDD

History
- First air date: April 22, 1987; 39 years ago
- Former call signs: KGRU (1987–1988, CP)
- Call sign meaning: Possibly a form of Cherry

Technical information
- Licensing authority: FCC
- Facility ID: 53674
- Class: C2
- ERP: 7,800 watts
- HAAT: 369 meters (1,211 ft)
- Transmitter coordinates: 46°29′12″N 120°0′5″W

Links
- Public license information: Public file; LMS
- Webcast: Listen Live
- Website: cherryfm.com

KARY-FM (100.9 MHz) is a radio station broadcasting a classic hits format. Licensed to Grandview, Washington, United States, the station serves the Yakima area. The station is currently owned by Stephens Media Group, through licensee SMG-Yakima, LLC.

== History ==
The station went on the air as KGRU on April 22, 1987. On May 1, 1988, the station changed its call sign to the current KARY-FM.

On May 26, 2010, it was rumoured that KARY's parent company, New Northwest Broadcasters, stations could possibly be sold in the near future. Principal of Revitalization Partners, Alan Davis, says "The stations are on the air; it’s business as usual. I can only tell you there appears to be demand for the stations." In 2012, the stations were sold to James Ingstad.
