= KKOR =

- Astoria, Oregon; United States
- Frequency: 1230 kHz
- Branding: ESPN 106.3

Programming
- Format: Sports talk
- Affiliations: ESPN Radio

Ownership
- Owner: Ohana Media Group; (OMG FCC Licenses, LLC)
- Sister stations: KAST; KCRX-FM; KLMY; KVAS-FM

History
- First air date: 1950 (as KVAS at 1050)
- Former call signs: KVAS (1950–2001); KKEE (2001–2012); KVAS (2012–2016)
- Former frequencies: 1050 kHz (1950–1952)
- Call sign meaning: K K ORegon

Technical information
- Licensing authority: FCC
- Facility ID: 38907
- Class: C
- Power: 1,000 watts
- Transmitter coordinates: 46°11′15″N 123°49′30″W
- Translator: 106.3 K292GZ (Astoria)

Links
- Public license information: Public file; LMS
- Webcast: Listen live
- Website: sports1063.com

KKOR (1230 AM) is an American radio station licensed to serve the community of Astoria, Oregon. The station, which began broadcasting in 1950, is currently owned by the Ohana Media Group and the broadcast license is held by OMG FCC Licenses, LLC.

== Programming ==
From November 14, 2011 to July 1, 2016, the station broadcast a classic country music format branded as "KVAS 1230, The Spirit of the West". The station dropped its KKEE call sign to return to its original KVAS call sign on April 3, 2012.

== History ==
=== The beginning ===
This station began broadcasting in 1950 as a daytime-only facility with 250 watts of power on a frequency of 1050 kHz as KVAS. The station's original license holder, Clatsop Video Broadcasters, was owned in partnership by Leroy E. "Ed" Parsons, E.W. Littlehales, and J.W. Spencer. A year earlier, Parsons had created the first cable television system in the United States and he is acknowledged as the "father of community antenna television".

KVAS moved to the current 1230 kHz frequency in February 1952 and the shift permitted them to begin 24-hour operation at the 250 watt power level. The partners had the broadcast license transferred to a new company, KVAS, Inc., but it was unable to overcome the financial difficulties it faced. The station was transferred to William Ohlmann acting as receiver for KVAS, Inc., and in January 1954, he sold it to owners on more solid financial footing.

=== Lower Columbia Broadcasting ===
Lower Columbia Broadcasting Company, Inc., took control of KVAS in January 1954. The station began broadcasting a country & western music format. In 1963, the station was granted authorization to increase its daytime broadcast power to 1,000 watts while maintaining its 250 watt nighttime signal.

The company itself was purchased in a deal consummated in March 1974 with the presidency passing from William Tracy Moore to Charles A. Farmer. Under Farmer's leadership, KVAS continued to play a mix of country & western and Top 40 music.

In April 1981, the Lower Columbia Broadcasting Company, Inc., announced their intention to sell KVAS to Kay Broadcasting, Inc. The deal was approved by the FCC on June 29, 1981. Nine years later, in April 1990, Kay Broadcasting, Inc., reached an agreement to sell KVAS back to Lower Columbia Broadcasting Company, Inc. The deal was approved by the FCC on June 11, 1990, and the transaction was consummated on July 1, 1990.

=== New owners ===
Lower Columbia Broadcasting Company, Inc., announced in August 1997 that it had agreed to sell KVAS to Dolphin Radio, Inc. The deal was approved by the FCC on September 23, 1997, and the transaction was consummated on October 17, 1997. Less than two years later, in June 1999, Dolphin Radio, Inc., notified the FCC that it had contracted to sell this station to New Northwest Broadcasters subsidiary New Northwest Broadcasters II, Inc., as part of a four-station deal valued at $1.5 million. The deal was approved by the FCC on August 24, 1999, and the transaction was consummated on October 28, 1999.

=== KKEE era ===
Talk radio branding

The station was assigned the KKEE call sign by the Federal Communications Commission on January 11, 2001. This call sign had most recently resided on an FM sister station now known as KLMY (99.7 FM).

Sports radio branding

KKEE adopted a 24-hour sports talk radio format starting on Monday, May 23, 2004. This change ended the decades-long run of the locally produced "Sunday Scandinavian Hour".

The station flipped from sports talk as an ESPN Radio affiliate to a liberal talk radio format, originally including select shows from Air America Radio, in October 2007. After Air America folded, syndicated weekday talk programming included The Stephanie Miller Show, The Ed Schultz Show and The Thom Hartmann Program from Dial Global, The Dr. Dean Edell Radio Program and Coast to Coast AM from Premiere Radio Networks, plus The Alan Colmes Show from Fox News Radio.

In addition to its regularly scheduled news and talk programming, KKEE also aired local high school sports, Oregon State University Beavers football, and National Basketball Association games as a member of the Portland Trail Blazers radio network. In 2009, the station transitioned to a sports radio format.

== KVAS ==
On November 14, 2011, KKEE changed its format from sports to classic country music and announced that it would be changing the station's call sign back to KVAS. KKEE changed its call sign back to KVAS on April 3, 2012.

== KKOR ==
On July 1, 2016, KVAS changed its call sign to KKOR and changed its format from classic country to classic hits, branded as "106.3 The Beach" (the FM frequency in the branding is for translator K292GZ 106.3 FM Astoria, Oregon).

On August 1, 2023, KKOR changed its format from classic hits to sports, branded as "ESPN 106.3" with programming from ESPN Radio.
