= KFLG (AM) =

Adult standards radio station in Bullhead City, Arizona

- Bullhead City, Arizona; United States
- Broadcast area: Bullhead City, Arizona
- Frequency: 1000 kHz
- Branding: K-Star 103.3 FM

Programming
- Format: Adult standards
- Affiliations: Westwood One

Ownership
- Owner: Cameron Broadcasting, Inc.
- Sister stations: KAAA, KZZZ, KLUK, KNKK, KFLG-FM

History
- First air date: January 30, 1981 (as KRHS)
- Former call signs: KRHS (1981–1991)

Technical information
- Licensing authority: FCC
- Facility ID: 65676
- Class: D
- Power: 1,000 watts day
- Transmitter coordinates: 35°10′10″N 114°38′2″W
- Translators: 101.9 K270CI (Kingman); 103.3 K277DK (Bullhead City)

Links
- Public license information: Public file; LMS
- Webcast: Listen Live
- Website: kstar993fm.com

KFLG (1000 kHz, "K-Star 103.3 FM") is an AM radio station broadcasting an adult standards/MOR format. Licensed to Bullhead City, Arizona, United States, the station is owned by Cameron Broadcasting, Inc. and features programming from Westwood One. The station operates during the day only and signs off at local sunset to protect clear channel station KNWN in Seattle.

== History ==
The station went on the air as KRHS on January 30, 1981. On January 28, 1991, the station changed its call sign to the current KFLG.

Logo when using the 99.3 translator

== Translator ==
The station is also heard on 101.9 FM, through a translator in Kingman, Arizona, and on 103.3 FM, through a translator in Bullhead City, Arizona.

Call sign	Frequency	City of license	FID	ERP (W)	HAAT	Class	FCC info
K270CI	101.9 FM	Kingman, Arizona	145133	250	63 m (207 ft)	D	LMS
K277DK	103.3 FM	Bullhead City, Arizona	201367	250	0 m (0 ft)	D	LMS
