= Brian and the Judge =

Brian and the Judge was a radio talk show syndicated by Fox News Radio. It was hosted by Fox News personalities Brian Kilmeade and Judge Andrew Napolitano. The show was launched to replace Tony Snow's radio show when he left the program to become White House Press Secretary in 2006. The show is aired daily between the hours of 9:00 a.m. to 12:00 noon ET on XM and Sirius satellite radio networks and over the internet. The show is carried nationally for one to three hours on various radio stations, however is not broadcast over terrestrial radio in all markets. On May 28, 2010, Napolitano announced he was leaving the show, leaving Kilmeade to host the show solo under the title Kilmeade and Friends.
