= KVAS-FM =

- Ilwaco, Washington; United States
- Broadcast area: Astoria, Oregon
- Frequency: 103.9 MHz
- Branding: Eagle Country 103.9

Programming
- Format: Country
- Affiliations: Westwood One, Premiere Radio Networks

Ownership
- Owner: Ohana Media Group; (OMG FCC Licenses, LLC)
- Sister stations: KAST, KCRX-FM, KKOR, KLMY

History
- First air date: 2001
- Former call signs: KBKH (1998–2000, CP); KAQX (2000–2001, CP); KVAS (2001–2011)

Technical information
- Licensing authority: FCC
- Facility ID: 56236
- Class: C3
- ERP: 11,000 watts
- HAAT: 151 meters (495 ft)
- Transmitter coordinates: 46°10′56.00″N 123°48′9.00″W

Links
- Public license information: Public file; LMS
- Website: eaglecountry1039.com

KVAS-FM (103.9 FM, "Eagle Country 103.9") is an American radio station broadcasting a country music format. Licensed to Ilwaco, Washington, United States, the station is currently owned by Ohana Media Group and features programming from Dial Global and Premiere Radio Networks.
