= KBBO (AM) =

Radio station in Yakima, Washington

- Yakima, Washington; United States
- Broadcast area: Yakima, Washington
- Frequency: 1390 kHz
- Branding: 1390 AM 104.5 FM The Fan

Programming
- Format: Sports
- Affiliations: Fox Sports Radio

Ownership
- Owner: Stephens Media Group; (SMG-Yakima, LLC)
- Sister stations: KHHK, KRSE, KXDD, KARY-FM, KTCR

History
- First air date: 1947 (as KYAK)
- Former call signs: KYAK (1947–1957); KLOQ (1957–1963); KBBO (1963–2004); KJOX (2004–2012); KTCR (2012–2013)

Technical information
- Licensing authority: FCC
- Facility ID: 49875
- Class: D
- Power: 1,400 watts day 5 watts night
- Transmitter coordinates: 46°34′14.3″N 120°27′21.6″W
- Translator: 101.7 K269HF (Yakima)
- Repeater: 99.7 KHHK-HD4 (Yakima)

Links
- Public license information: Public file; LMS
- Website: thefanyakima.com

KBBO (1390 kHz) is an AM radio station licensed to Yakima, Washington, United States; the station serves the Yakima area. It carries a sports talk format. The station is currently owned by Stephens Media Group.

== History ==
With a power of 250 watts, the station signed on the air in 1947 as KYAK at 1400 kHz. To increase power to 1000 watts day and 500 at night, the station reduced its frequency to 1390 kHz. In 1957, adopting a rock n' roll format and under the ownership of Warren Durham and Bill Shela, the station changed its call letters from KYAK to KLOQ.

In 1963, KLOQ was sold, and the call letters were changed to KBBO, A religious format was adopted.

In 2012, after New Northwest Broadcasters went into receivership, its stations in Washington were sold to James Ingstad of Fargo, North Dakota.

On August 29, 2013, KBBO and its talk format moved from 980 AM to 1390 AM, swapping frequencies with classic country-formatted KTCR.

On February 25, 2015, KBBO changed its format to sports, branded as "1390 The Fan".

On September 23, 2015, AllAccess.com reported that Ingstad had asked the Federal Communications Commission to allow the station to go silent due to "transmitter failure."

In April 2018, Ingstad Radio sold 14 of its stations in Yakima and the Tri-Cities to Stephens Media Group.
