= KAST (AM) =

Radio station in Astoria, Oregon

- Astoria, Oregon; United States
- Frequency: 1370 kHz
- Branding: KAST 1370

Programming
- Format: Talk radio

Ownership
- Owner: Ohana Media Group; (OMG FCC Licenses, LLC)
- Sister stations: KCRX-FM, KKOR, KLMY, KVAS-FM

History
- First air date: 1935
- Former frequencies: 1370 kHz (1935–1939); 1200 kHz (1939–1941); 1230 kHz (1941–1950)
- Call sign meaning: Astoria

Technical information
- Licensing authority: FCC
- Facility ID: 74433
- Class: B
- Power: 1,000 watts
- Transmitter coordinates: 46°10′31″N 123°50′58″W
- Translator: 103.5 K278CW (Astoria)

Links
- Public license information: Public file; LMS
- Website: kast1370.com

KAST (1370 AM) is a commercial radio station licensed to Astoria, Oregon, United States. Owned by OMG FCC Licenses, LLC, it features a talk radio format.

== History ==
KAST was originally on 1370 kHz then moved to 1200 kHz in 1939. In 1941 it moved to 1230 kHz as a result of the NARBA agreement. It moved back to 1370 kHz in 1950.

Robert D. Holmes served as a station manager at KAST in the 1930s, prior to serving as Governor of Oregon.

=== Expanded Band assignment ===
On March 17, 1997, the Federal Communications Commission (FCC) announced that eighty-eight stations had been given permission to move to newly available "Expanded Band" transmitting frequencies, ranging from 1610 to 1700 kHz, with KAST authorized to move from 1370 to 1700 kHz.

A Construction Permit for the expanded band station was assigned the call letters KCHT on December 22, 1997. However this station was never built, and its Construction Permit was cancelled on January 15, 2004.
