= KLMY =

Radio station in Long Beach, Washington, United States

- Long Beach, Washington; United States
- Broadcast area: North Oregon Coast
- Frequency: 99.7 MHz
- Branding: Clammy 99.7

Programming
- Format: Hot adult contemporary
- Affiliations: Westwood One

Ownership
- Owner: Ohana Media Group; (OMG FCC Licenses, LLC)
- Sister stations: KAST, KCRX-FM, KKOR, KVAS-FM

History
- First air date: May 1989
- Former call signs: KLBP (1986, CP); KKEE (1986–2001); KKEE-FM (2001); KAQX (2001–2006); KAST-FM (2006–2009); KJOX-FM (2009–2010)
- Former frequencies: 94.3 MHz (1989–2006)
- Call sign meaning: "Clammy"

Technical information
- Licensing authority: FCC
- Facility ID: 38910
- Class: C3
- ERP: 15,000 watts
- HAAT: 71 meters (233 ft)
- Transmitter coordinates: 46°18′51″N 124°3′7″W

Links
- Public license information: Public file; LMS
- Website: clammy997.com

KLMY (99.7 FM) is a radio station licensed to Long Beach, Washington, United States. The station is owned by Ohana Media Group and features programming from Westwood One.

== History ==
The station was assigned the call sign KLBP on January 30, 1986. On November 28, 1986, it changed its call sign to KKEE, on January 11, 2001 to KKEE-FM, on January 18, 2001 to KAQX, on January 30, 2006 to KAST-FM with an adult contemporary format, on January 14, 2009 to KJOX-FM with a sports format from ESPN Radio, and on February 23, 2010 to the current KLMY.
