= KRSE =

Radio station in Yakima, Washington

Yakima, Washington; United States
- Frequency: 105.7 MHz
- Branding: 105.7 The Hawk

Programming
- Format: Classic rock

Ownership
- Owner: Stephens Media Group; (SMG-Yakima, LLC)
- Sister stations: KHHK, KTCR, KXDD, KARY, KBBO

History
- First air date: August 18, 1977; 48 years ago (as KYBO at 98.3)
- Former call signs: KYBO (1977–1981)
- Former frequencies: 98.3 MHz (1977–1990)

Technical information
- Licensing authority: FCC
- Facility ID: 49876
- Class: C1
- ERP: 100,000 watts
- HAAT: 172.3 meters
- Transmitter coordinates: 46°42′41.00″N 120°37′20.00″W

Links
- Public license information: Public file; LMS
- Webcast: Listen Live
- Website: thehawkyakima.com

KRSE (105.7 FM, "The Hawk") is a radio station broadcasting a classic rock format. Licensed to Yakima, Washington, United States, the station serves the Yakima area. The station is currently owned by Stephens Media Group.

On August 29, 2014, at 5PM, after playing "Rock Me Amadeus" by Falco, KRSE changed their format from adult hits (as "Bob FM") to classic rock, branded as 105.7 The Hawk; the first song as "The Hawk" was "Welcome to the Jungle" by Guns 'N Roses.
