= KXDD (FM) =

Radio station in Yakima, Washington

- Yakima, Washington; United States
- Frequency: 104.1 MHz
- Branding: 104.1 KXDD (Double-D)

Programming
- Format: Country

Ownership
- Owner: Stephens Media Group; (SMG-Yakima, LLC)
- Sister stations: KHHK; KRSE; KTCR; KARY; KBBO

History
- First air date: July 1, 1971
- Former call signs: KAAR-FM (1971–1974); KUTI-FM (1974–1977); KUEZ (1977–1982)

Technical information
- Licensing authority: FCC
- Facility ID: 7919
- Class: C1
- ERP: 100,000 watts
- HAAT: 245 meters (804 ft)
- Transmitter coordinates: 46°30′48.00″N 120°24′5.00″W

Links
- Public license information: Public file; LMS
- Webcast: Listen live
- Website: www.1041kxdd.com

KXDD (104.1 FM) is a radio station in Yakima, Washington, United States. Owned by Stephens Media Group, the station broadcasts a country music format.

== History ==
When they first signed on, they also played country music, as KAAR and KUTI-FM (co-owned with sister station 980 KUTI, now KTCR). But in 1977, the 104.1 frequency flipped to KUEZ, which had an Easy Listening format. Ironically, the KUEZ calls are currently on a 104.1 in Fallon, NV with a Soft Oldies format. In 1982 they adopted their current call sign, but it wasn't until around 1984 when country returned to 104.1 MHz.

On May 26, 2010, it was rumoured KXDD's parent company New Northwest Broadcasters's stations could possibly be sold in the near future. Principal of Revitalization Partners, Alan Davis says "The stations are on the air; it’s business as usual. I can only tell you there appears to be demand for the stations." In 2012, the stations were sold to James Ingstad. In April 2018, both stations in turn sold to Stephens Media Group.
