= Andrew Napolitano =

American syndicated columnist (born 1950)

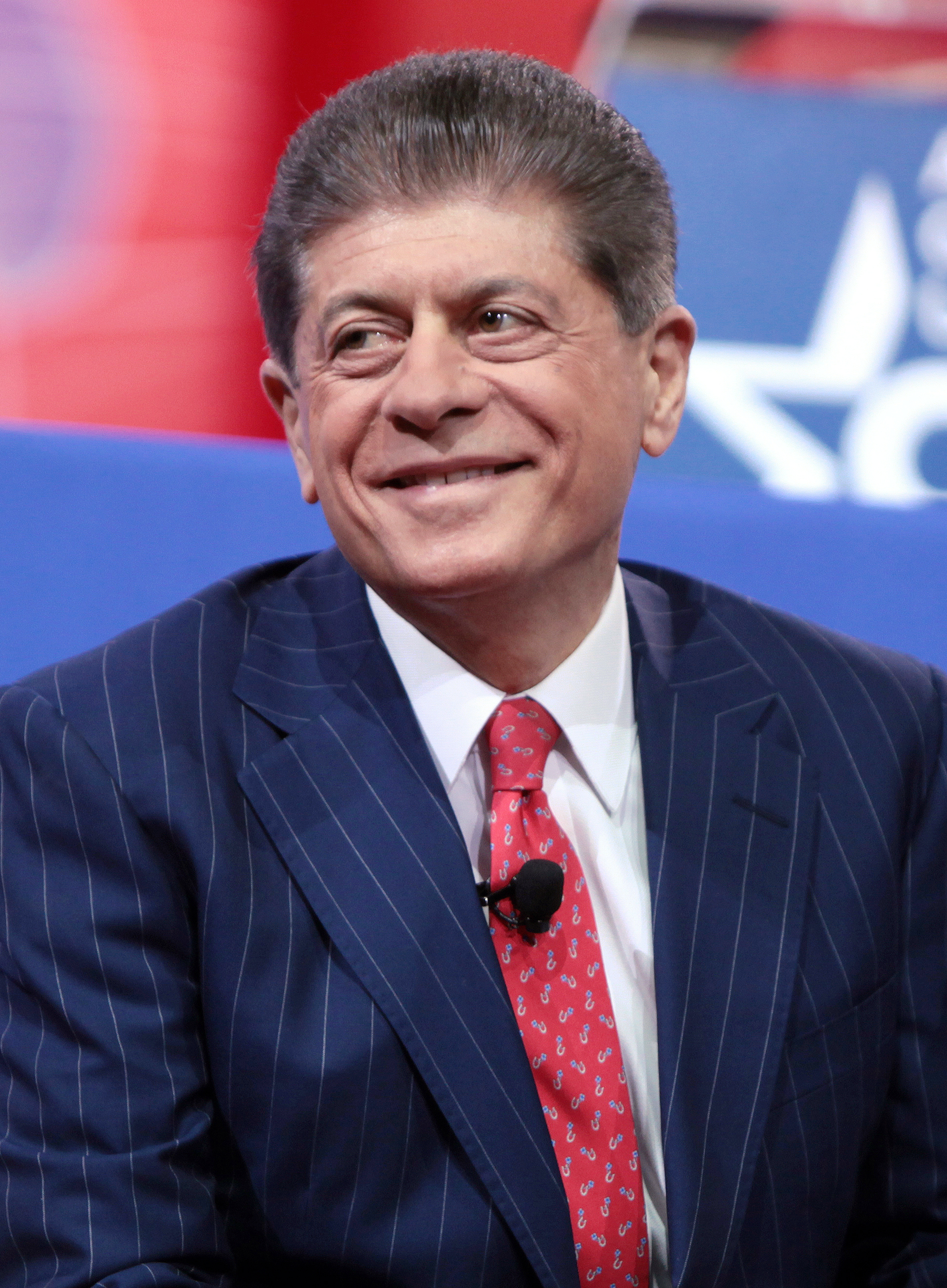
- Napolitano in 2015

Judge of the New Jersey Superior Court
- In office 1987–1995
- Appointed by: Thomas Kean

Personal details
- Born: Andrew Peter Napolitano; June 6, 1950 (age 76) Newark, New Jersey, U.S.
- Party: Libertarian
- Education: Princeton University (BA); University of Notre Dame (JD)
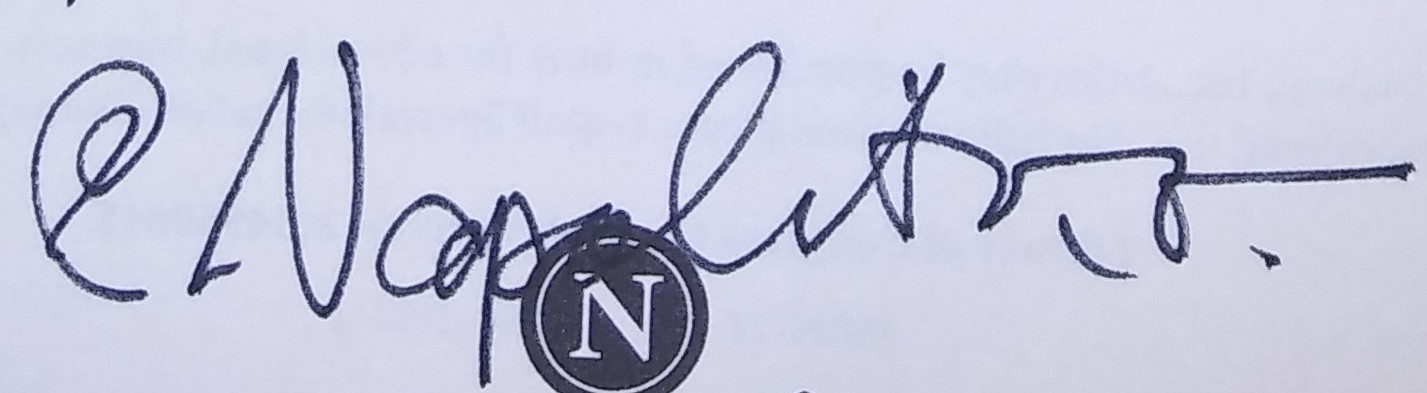
- Signature
- Website: Official website

Andrew Peter Napolitano (born June 6, 1950) is an American retired jurist and syndicated columnist whose work appears in publications including The Washington Times. Napolitano served as a New Jersey Superior Court judge from 1987 to 1995. He also served as a visiting professor at Widener University Delaware Law School, Seton Hall University School of Law, and Brooklyn Law School. He is a libertarian and has gained prominence in part due to his criticism of the administrations of George W. Bush, Barack Obama, and Donald Trump. Beginning in 1997, he became an analyst for Fox News, commenting on legal news and trials. He has written nine books on legal and political subjects. He was let go by Fox in 2021 due to sexual harassment allegations and now hosts his own Youtube show Judge Napolitano - Judging Freedom.

== Early life and judicial and academic career ==
Napolitano was born in Newark, New Jersey. He graduated with an A.B. in history from Princeton University in 1972 after completing a senior thesis titled "An Essay on the Origin and Evolution of Representative Government in the Colony of the Massachusetts Bay, 1630–1644." He received his J.D. from Notre Dame Law School and was admitted to the New Jersey bar in 1975. After law school, he entered private practice as a litigator. He first taught law for a brief period in 1980–1981 at Delaware Law School (now Widener). He sat on the New Jersey bench from 1987 to 1995, becoming the state's youngest then-sitting Superior Court judge.

Napolitano resigned his judgeship in 1995 to return to private practice. He served as an adjunct professor at Seton Hall University School of Law for 11 years, from 1989 to 2000. He served as a visiting professor at Brooklyn Law School from 2013 to 2017.

Napolitano told friends in 2017 that President Donald Trump told him he was considering him for a United States Supreme Court appointment should there be a second vacancy. Ultimately, Judge Brett Kavanaugh was chosen instead.

== Media career ==
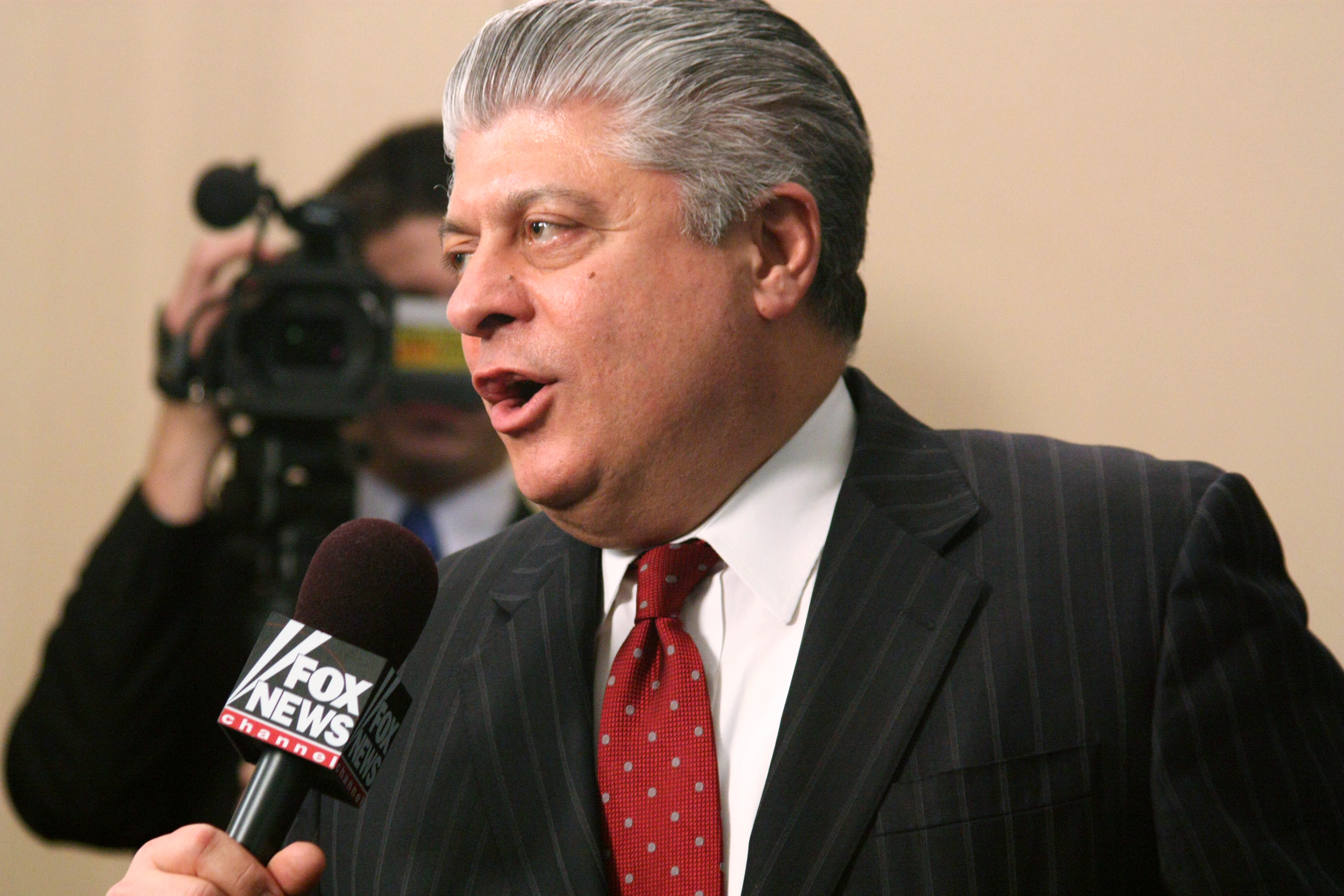
Napolitano in 2010

Before joining Fox as a news analyst, Napolitano was the presiding judge for the first season of Twentieth Television's syndicated court show Power of Attorney (2000–2002), in which people brought small-claims disputes to a televised courtroom. Differing from similar formats, the plaintiffs and defendants were represented pro bono by famous attorneys. He departed the series after its first season.

From 2006 to 2010, Napolitano co-hosted a talk radio show on Fox News Radio with Brian Kilmeade titled Brian and the Judge. He hosted a daily libertarian talk show called Freedom Watch that aired on Fox Business Channel. Frequent guests on Freedom Watch were Congressman Ron Paul, Lew Rockwell and Peter Schiff. He promoted the works of Friedrich Hayek and Ludwig von Mises in his program. The show originally aired every Wednesday at 2:00 p.m. on Fox News' Strategy Room and from September 14, 2009, aired three to four times a week. On June 12, 2010, it debuted as a weekly show on Fox Business. It was one of several programs dropped in February 2012 when FBN revamped its primetime lineup.

Napolitano regularly substituted for television host Glenn Beck when Beck was absent from his program. After Beck announced that he would be leaving Fox News, he asked Napolitano to replace him. He regularly provided legal analysis on top rated shows on both Fox News Channel and Fox Business Network, such as The Kelly File, The O'Reilly Factor, Varney & Co., The Fox Report with Shepard Smith, Fox & Friends and Special Report with Bret Baier until an appearance on March 16, 2017, related to a then-postulated conspiracy theory involving President Trump's accusation that former President Barack Obama had wiretapped him. On March 20, 2017, the Los Angeles Times reported that Napolitano was pulled off the air indefinitely because of the wiretapping claims; however, it was unclear whether Napolitano would return to the air or whether it was just a temporary move to remove him from the news cycle. He returned to the air on March 29 and stood by his claims concerning British intelligence. A 2020 book by CNN reporter Brian Stelter asserts that Attorney General William Barr met with Fox News boss Rupert Murdoch in October 2019 to request that Murdoch "muzzle" Napolitano and that Napolitano's Fox appearances have been limited since that meeting.

Napolitano was let go from his position as a contributor to Fox News in August 2021 after allegations of sexual harassment filed by a Fox Business production assistant. During his 24-year tenure as Fox News' Senior Judicial Analyst, Napolitano appeared on air more than 14,500 times, a record for any on-air personality at the network. After his career in television, Napolitano started his own Youtube show Judge Napolitano - Judging Freedom which, as of 2025, has over 625,000 subscribers.

== Politics ==
=== Specific positions ===
Napolitano is anti-abortion and holds that abortion "should be prohibited." He reasons that while a woman has a natural and undeniable right to privacy in her personal choices, the rule of necessity causes the right to life of the fetus, which he believes to begin at conception, to take priority for the duration of gestation. He believes the Supreme Court's ruling on interracial marriage in Loving v. Virginia (1967) set a precedent that would also require state recognition of same-sex marriage. He opposes capital punishment, saying, "I don't believe that the state has the moral authority to execute." He is a believer in the separation of Church and State.

With respect to both presidents Bush and Obama and their handling of civil liberties in the war on terror, Napolitano is a strong critic. In both his scholarly work, appearing in the New York University School of Law Journal of Law and Liberty, and in his book Suicide Pact, he criticized the actions of both presidents and their parties concerning torture, domestic spying, unilateral executive action and encroachments on political power.

After the release of the Mueller report on Russian interference in the 2016 election, Napolitano said the report showed that Trump engaged in numerous instances of obstruction of justice. However, the report deliberately refused to make a firm conclusion about obstruction of justice accusations.

According to The New York Times, Napolitano "has a taste for conspiracy theories". The Washington Post has described him as a "purveyor of conspiracy theories."

In 2010, Napolitano said, "It's hard for me to believe that it (7 World Trade Center) came down by itself... I am gratified to see that people across the board are interested. I think twenty years from now, people will look at 9/11 the way we look at the assassination of JFK today. It couldn't possibly have been done the way the government told us."

==== American Civil War views ====
Napolitano has made numerous controversial claims about the Civil War. Napolitano expressed disdain for Abraham Lincoln on Fox News, saying, "I am a contrarian on Abraham Lincoln." Napolitano has also claimed that slavery, while one of the most deplorable institutions in human history, could have been done away with peacefully due to being an already dying institution. Napolitano sees the Civil War as Abraham Lincoln's war by choice. More specifically, in a Daily Show segment, he said that Lincoln started the war "because he wanted to preserve the union, because he needed the tariffs from the southern states," a claim rejected by a panel of three distinguished historians of the Civil War: James Oakes, Eric Foner and Manisha Sinha. Napolitano argued that Lincoln could have solved the slavery question by paying slaveholders to release their slaves, a method known as compensated emancipation, thereby avoiding war. Lincoln did offer to pay to free the slaves in Delaware, but the Delaware legislature rejected him. He also asserted that Lincoln attempted to arm slaves, but two prominent historians of the Civil War said they had never heard of such an effort and PolitiFact rated the claim "pants-on-fire". He has asserted that slavery was dying a natural death at the time of the Civil War, a claim that Eric Foner on the Daily Show panel rejected. Foner said, "Slavery was not only viable, it was growing ... This idea that it was dying out or was going to die out is ridiculous." In his book Suicide Pact, Napolitano focused his criticism of Lincoln on the precedent set by his specific constitutional violations, such as his unilateral suspension of the right to habeas corpus and his institutionalization of military commission systems for civilian crimes.

Napolitano has also said that Lincoln enforced the Fugitive Slave Act "until the Civil War was over" by sending escaped slaves back to their owners. PolitiFact notes that "while there were cases when Lincoln enforced the law during the Civil War, he did so selectively when he thought it would help keep border states in the Union fold. When it came to slaves from Confederate states, the weight of the government actions fell heavily on the side of refusing to return escaped slaves." Furthermore, his claim that Lincoln enforced the act "until the Civil War was over" was indisputably false, as the Fugitive Slave Act was repealed in June 1864, more than ten months before the end of the war.

=== Judicial philosophy ===
Napolitano subscribes to a natural law jurisprudence that is influenced by a respect for originalist ideas and methods. He has expressed strong sympathies with the Randy Barnett new originalist vein of originalism, as it incorporates the natural law through an original understanding of the Ninth Amendment. He has published a favorable column on Barnett's idea of a constitutional presumption of liberty.

Napolitano's philosophy generally leans towards strong originalism while not accepting the limitations of the older types of originalism espoused by Robert Bork and Justice Antonin Scalia concerning the Constitution's open-ended provisions like the Ninth Amendment. He finds such limitations too restrictive on a judge's ability to apply the natural law to decide cases where the individual's liberty is at stake. He is a strong believer in economic liberties. He argues that Lochner v. New York was overruled in error in the West Coast Hotel case, as the Contracts Clause and the Fifth and Fourteenth Amendment due process clauses protect a sphere of personal economic liberty.

In September 2015, Napolitano was the featured speaker at a conference held by the Republican government watchdog group Judicial Watch.

==== Allegations that British intelligence wiretapped Trump Tower ====
On March 16, 2017, citing three unnamed intelligence sources, Napolitano said on the program Fox & Friends that Britain's signals intelligence agency, Government Communications Headquarters (GCHQ), had engaged in covert electronic surveillance of then-candidate Donald Trump during the 2016 presidential campaign on orders from President Obama. He said that by using the British intelligence apparatus, Obama would avoid leaving "fingerprints" that could identify the origin of this surveillance action. In response to “Fox & Friends” host Brian Kilmead stating that Napolitano was claiming Trump's phone was “wiretapped”, Napolitano denied actual physical tampering, instead citing the agency has digital access to digital information.

In a column on the Fox website, he wrote that GCHQ "most likely provided Obama with transcripts of Trump's calls. The NSA has given GCHQ full 24/7 access to its computers, so GCHQ — a foreign intelligence agency that, like the NSA, operates outside our constitutional norms — has the digital versions of all electronic communications made in America in 2016, including Trump's." One of his sources was former Central Intelligence Agency (CIA) officer Larry C. Johnson, who later told CNN that Napolitano had misrepresented the statements he made on an online discussion board. Johnson, citing two anonymous sources, claimed that the GCHQ was passing information on the Trump campaign to U.S. intelligence through a "back-channel", but stressed that the GCHQ did not "wiretap" Trump or his associates and that alleged information sharing by the GCHQ was not done at the direction of the Obama administration.

On March 16, White House Press Secretary Sean Spicer repeated Napolitano's claim at a White House press briefing. The following day, GCHQ responded with a rare public statement: "Recent allegations made by media commentator Judge Andrew Napolitano about GCHQ being asked to conduct 'wiretapping' against the then president-elect are nonsense. They are utterly ridiculous and should be ignored." A British government source said the allegation was "totally untrue and quite frankly absurd". Admiral Michael S. Rogers, director of the National Security Agency, said he has seen nothing to suggest that there was "any such activity," nor any request to do so. Former GCHQ director David Omand told the Financial Times that "The suggestion that [Barack Obama] asked GCHQ to spy on Trump is just completely barking—that would be evident to anyone who knew the system."

The claim started a diplomatic dispute with Britain. Tim Farron, the Liberal Democrat leader in Britain, said, "Trump is compromising the vital UK–US security relationship to try to cover his own embarrassment. This harms our and US security." The Telegraph said that two U.S. officials had personally apologized for the allegation. The British government also said that the U.S. government promised not to repeat these claims. The White House denied reports that it had apologized to the British government, saying Spicer was merely "pointing to public reports" without endorsing them.

On April 12, 2017, The Guardian reported that GCHQ and other European intelligence agencies had intercepted communications between members of the Trump campaign team and Russian officials and shared the intelligence with their U.S. counterparts. The communications were obtained through "incidental collection" as part of routine surveillance of Russian intelligence assets, not from a targeted operation against Trump or his campaign.

Fox News distanced itself from Napolitano's claims and suspended him from contributing to the network's output, according to the Los Angeles Times and the Associated Press. He returned on March 29 after a nearly two-week absence, but continued to support his earlier claims.

== Personal life ==
Napolitano splits his time living in Manhattan and Newton, New Jersey, where he owns a farm that produces maple syrup.

Napolitano has stated that he is not related to former Secretary of Homeland Security Janet Napolitano, whom he sometimes jokingly calls "Evil Cousin Janet".

Napolitano is a vegetarian.

Napolitano identifies as a Traditionalist Catholic who is opposed to the reforms of Vatican II and was critical of Pope Francis.

Napolitano was sued by two New Jersey men alleging sexual assault, in one case arising during his time on the bench. Napolitano countersued in one case bringing a libel case. All three suits were later withdrawn and it is reportedly unclear whether any financial settlement occurred.

== Bibliography ==
=== Books ===
- Constitutional Chaos: What Happens When the Government Breaks its Own Laws (2004) ISBN 978-0785260837.
- The Constitution in Exile: How the Federal Government Has Seized Power by Rewriting the Supreme Law of the Land (2006) ISBN 978-1595550705
- A Nation of Sheep (2007) ISBN 978-1595551924.
- Dred Scott's Revenge: A Legal History of Race and Freedom in America (2009) ISBN 978-1418575571.
- Lies the Government Told You: Myth, Power, and Deception in American History (2010) ISBN 978-1418584245.
- It is Dangerous to be Right When the Government is Wrong: The Case for Personal Freedom (2011) ISBN 978-1595554130.
- Theodore and Woodrow: How Two American Presidents Destroyed Constitutional Freedom (2012) ISBN 978-1595554215.
- The Freedom Answer Book: How the Government Is Taking Away Your Constitutional Freedoms (2013) ISBN 978-1400320295.
- Suicide Pact: The Radical Expansion of Presidential Powers and the Lethal Threat to American Liberty (2014) ISBN 978-0718021931.

=== Book contributions ===
- "Introduction." In: Shattered Dreams: 100 Stories of Government Abuse. Foreword by Ted Nugent. Washington: National Center for Public Policy Research (2007), p. 7. ISBN 978-0966596137.
- "A Judicial Odyssey Toward Freedom." In: I Chose Liberty: Autobiographies of Contemporary Libertarians, compiled by Walter Block. Auburn, Alabama: Ludwig von Mises Institute (2010), pp. 231–235. ISBN 978-1610160025.
- "Foreword." In: Robert Higgs, Taking a Stand: Reflections on Life, Liberty, and the Economy. Independent Institute (2015), pp. xv–xvii. ISBN 978-1598132045.
- "Foreword." In: Murray N. Rothbard, The Progressive Era, edited by Patrick Newman. Auburn, Alabama: Ludwig von Mises Institute (2017), pp. 9–13. ISBN 978-1610166775. Audiobook available.

=== Book reviews ===
- "Judge Napolitano Gives Verdict on Robert Higgs Books." Review of Taking a Stand: Reflections on Life, Liberty, and the Economy by Robert Higgs. The Independent (Quarterly Newsletter), Vol. 25, No. 4, p. 1 (Winter 2016). Full issue available.
- "The Camp of the Saints." Review of The Camp of the Saints by Jean Raspail. Creators (October 25, 2018).

=== Academic works ===
- "The News Person's Shield Law: A Welcome Acceptance by the Federal Courts of an Important State Privilege." New Jersey Lawyer Magazine, Vol. 113, pp. 13–17 (November 1985).
- "Whatever Happened to Freedom of Speech? A Defense of 'State Interest of the Highest Order' as a Unifying Standard for Erratic First Amendment Jurisprudence." Seton Hall Law Review, Vol. 29, pp. 1197–1276 (1999).
- "Liberty v. Tyranny: A Constant Struggle." Regent University Law Review, Vol. 22, No. 2, pp. 291–299 (2010). Full issue available.

This speech was originally presented as the keynote address to the Regent University Law Review and The Federalist Society for Law & Public Policy Studies Media and the Law Symposium at Regent University School of Law, October 9–10, 2009, under the title "When Does Regulation Go Too Far?"

- "A Legal History of National Security Law and Individual Rights in the United States." New York University Law School Journal of Law & Liberty, Vol. 8, pp. 396–555 (2014). Full issue available.
- "Protecting Hatred Preserves Freedom: Why Offensive Expressions Command Constitutional Protection." Journal of Law and Policy, Vol. 25, No. 1, pp. 161–184 (2016). Full issue available.
- Freedom’s Anchor: An Introduction to Natural Law Jurisprudence in American Constitutional History (2023) ISBN 978-1680537079.
