= KZZZ =

News/talk radio station in Bullhead City, Arizona

- Bullhead City, Arizona; United States
- Broadcast area: Laughlin, Nevada
- Frequency: 1490 kHz
- Branding: KZZZ fm 94.1

Programming
- Format: News–talk
- Affiliations: Fox News Radio; Premiere Radio Networks; Westwood One; Salem Radio Network

Ownership
- Owner: Cameron Broadcasting, Inc.
- Sister stations: KAAA

History
- First air date: May 5, 1981

Technical information
- Licensing authority: FCC
- Facility ID: 8387
- Class: C
- Power: 1,000 watts
- Transmitter coordinates: 35°10′8″N 114°38′16″W
- Translators: 93.3 K227DV (Bullhead City); 94.1 K231CH (Bullhead City)

Links
- Public license information: Public file; LMS
- Webcast: Listen Live
- Website: talkatoz.com

KZZZ (1490 AM) is a radio station broadcasting a news–talk format licensed to Bullhead City, Arizona, United States. The station is owned by Cameron Broadcasting and features programming from Fox News Radio, Westwood One and Premiere Radio Networks.

== History ==
The station was assigned the call letters KBAS on May 8, 1981. On June 21, 2000, the station changed its call sign to the current KZZZ. In 2000, the station was changed from adult standards station "K-Star" to the current news-talk format. "K-Star" was moved to 1000 kHz and now has the calls KFLG.
