= KAAA =

Radio station in Kingman, Arizona

- Kingman, Arizona; United States
- Frequency: 1230 kHz
- Branding: KAAA fm 97.5

Programming
- Format: News–talk
- Affiliations: Fox News Radio; Premiere Networks; Westwood One; Salem Radio Network

Ownership
- Owner: Cameron Broadcasting, Inc.
- Sister stations: KZZZ

History
- First air date: October 17, 1949
- Former call signs: KGAN (1949–1956)
- Call sign meaning: Double meaning of "A to Z" and both stations standing for Arizona's postal abbreviation

Technical information
- Licensing authority: FCC
- Facility ID: 55492
- Class: C
- Power: 1,000 watts unlimited
- Transmitter coordinates: 35°9′49″N 114°4′12″W
- Translators: 97.5 K248CO (Kingman); 98.3 K252FW (Kingman)

Links
- Public license information: Public file; LMS
- Webcast: Listen Live
- Website: talkatoz.com

KAAA (1230 AM) is a radio station broadcasting a news–talk format, licensed to Kingman, Arizona, United States. The station is owned by Cameron Broadcasting, Inc. and forms a full-time simulcast with KZZZ in Bullhead City. The stations feature programming from Fox News Radio, Premiere Networks, Westwood One and Salem Radio Network among others.

== History ==
KGAN signed on October 7, 1949. It broadcast with 250 watts on 1230 kHz. The station, an ABC affiliate, was sold in early 1956 by original owner J. James Glancy to Wallace Stone and John F. Holbrook for $25,000; the new owners changed the call letters to the present KAAA on February 19, 1956. Stone bought out Holbrook two years later, and in 1963, the station was authorized to increase daytime power to 1,000 watts. Stone sold KAAA in 1971 for $225,000 to Sun Mountain Broadcasting, the principals of which included an FM station applicant in Lake Havasu City and a station salesman. Under Sun Mountain, a companion FM station, KZZZ 92.7 (now KFLG-FM 94.7), was launched. By the time KAAA-KZZZ was sold to Mohave Sun Broadcasting in 1981, KAAA broadcast a mixed Top 40-country format.

In 2001, KAAA was consolidated with KZZZ at that station's Bullhead City studio base. The former Kingman studio and transmitter building was demolished in 2014 to allow redevelopment of the land. Cameron currently maintains studios in Kingman, Bullhead City and Lake Havasu City.
