= Shadowlands (Klaus Schulze album) =

Studio album by Klaus Schulze
- Released: 22 February 2013
- Recorded: 2012
- Genres: Space music, ambient
- Length: Disc 1: 75:42; Disc 2: 73:14
- Label: Synthetic Symphony
- Producer: Klaus Schulze

Klaus Schulze chronology
Big in Japan (2010)	Shadowlands (2013)	Big in Europe (2013–14)

Shadowlands is the forty-first album by Klaus Schulze. Taking in consideration the previously released multi-disc box sets (Silver Edition, Historic Edition, Jubilee Edition, Contemporary Works I, and Contemporary Works II), it could be viewed as Schulze's one hundred and second album. This is Klaus Schulze's first solo studio album since 2007's Kontinuum. Shadowlands was released on 22 February 2013 in two editions, with the limited edition (limited to 3,000 copies) containing an additional CD with two bonus tracks.

== Track listing ==
All tracks composed by Klaus Schulze.

Disc 1

No.	Title	Length
1.	"Shadowlights"	41:12
2.	"In Between"	17:07
3.	"Licht und Schatten"	17:23

Disc 2

No.	Title	Note	Length
1.	"The Rhodes Violin"	different version on Eternal (2017) as "Rhodes Romance"	55:24
2.	"Tibetan Loops"		17:50

== Personnel ==
- Klaus Schulze – electronics
- Lisa Gerrard – vocals
- Chrysta Bell – vocals
- Julia Messenger – vocals
- Thomas Kagermann – violin, flute, vocals
