= Big in Japan: Live in Tokyo 2010 =

Live album by Klaus Schulze
- Released: 22 September 2010
- Recorded: 20–21 March 2010 (Tokyo, Japan)
- Genre: Space music, ambient
- Label: Captain Trip Records
- Producer: Klaus Schulze

Klaus Schulze chronology
Dziekuje Bardzo (2009)	Big in Japan: Live in Tokyo 2010 (2010)	Shadowlands (2013)

Professional ratings
Review scores
Source	Rating
Allmusic	3.5/5 stars

Big in Japan: Live in Tokyo 2010 is the fortieth album by Klaus Schulze. Taking in consideration the previously released multi-disc box sets (Silver Edition, Historic Edition, Jubilee Edition, Contemporary Works I, and Contemporary Works II), it could be viewed as Schulze's one hundred and first album. This album contains music from two final concerts at the Tokyo Kokusai Forum Hall in Tokyo, Japan on 20–21 March 2010 in Schulze's first and only visit to Japan. This is Schulze's first album without guest vocalist Lisa Gerrard since his 2007 album Kontinuum. The album was originally released on 22 September 2010 in Japan by Captain Trip Records as a limited edition deluxe boxed set (500 copies) of two CDs and a DVD with an 80-page photo book. This became known as the "Japanese Edition". A slightly different general release was released in Europe on 26 November 2010. This version, named the "European Edition", features a different track order between the CDs and the DVD, and slightly different track lengths. On 19 April 2011 a third version of Big in Japan was released in the United States. This "American Edition" consists of the same two CDs as the European version, but features a completely different DVD.

== Track listing ==
All tracks composed by Klaus Schulze.

Disc 1

No.	Title	Note	Length
1.	"A Crystal Poem"	also on DVD; on EE only on DVD	34:12
2.	"The Crystal Returns"	on EE on CD1 as track 1, 38:09	40:09

Disc 2

No.	Title	Note	Length
1.	"La Joyeuse Apocalypse"	46:41 on EE; on AE also on DVD (47:28)	46:28
2.	"Nippon Benefit"	14:16 on EE; on AE also on DVD (16:38)	14:04
3.	"The Deductive Approach"	12:12 on EE; on AE also on DVD (13:33)	11:58

DVD

No.	Title	Note	Length
1.	"A Crystal Poem"	also on CD1 of JE	34:12
2.	"Sequencers are Beautiful"	only on DVD; on EE also on CD1 as track 2, 39:00	43:49

== Difference between editions ==
Track	Japanese Edition	European Edition	American Edition
The Crystal Returns	CD 1, track 2 (40:09)	CD 1, track 1 (38:09)	CD 1, track 1 (38:09)
Sequencers are Beautiful	DVD, track 2 (43:49)	CD 1, track 2 (39:00); DVD, track 2 (43:49)	CD 1, track 2 (39:00)
The Deductive Approach	CD 2, track 3 (11:58)	CD 2, track 3 (12:12)	CD 2, track 3 (12:12); DVD, track 2 (13:33)
A Crystal Poem	CD 1, track 1 (34:12); DVD, track 1 (34:12)	DVD, track 1 (34:12)	—
La Joyeuse Apocalypse	CD 2, track 1 (46:28)	CD 2, track 1 (46:41)	CD 2, track 1 (46:41); DVD, track 1 (47:28)
Nippon Benefit	CD 2, track 2 (14:04)	CD 2, track 2 (14:16)	CD 2, track 2 (14:16); DVD, track 3 (16:38)

== Notes ==
The music is not presented chronologically. On 20 March these tracks were played in the following sequence:

- The Crystal Returns
- Sequencers are Beautiful
- The Deductive Approach

On 21 March these tracks were played in the following sequence:

- A Crystal Poem
- La Joyeuse Apocalypse
- Nippon Benefit
