= Deus Arrakis =

Studio album by Klaus Schulze
- Released: 1 July 2022
- Recorded: 2021–2022
- Studio: Moldau Studio, Hambühren, Germany
- Length: 77:23
- Label: SPV
- Producer: Tom Dams

Klaus Schulze chronology
Next of Kin (2019)	Deus Arrakis (2022)	101, Milky Way (2024)

Deus Arrakis is the forty-seventh album by Klaus Schulze. It was released on 1 July 2022. It is the final album Schulze made before he died of renal failure in April 2022. Taking in consideration the previously released multi-disc box sets (Silver Edition, Historic Edition, Jubilee Edition, Contemporary Works I, and Contemporary Works II), it could be viewed as Schulze's one hundred and eighth album.

The album was inspired by the 1965 Frank Herbert science-fiction novel Dune and instigated by Schulze's recent collaboration with Hans Zimmer on the soundtrack for Denis Villeneuve's 2021 film adaptation. Dune was a longtime source of fascination for Schulze; he also made an album in 1979 inspired by the book, as well as a song for Herbert on his 1978 work X, a concept album of six "musical biographies".

== Reception ==
Steve Krakow of the Chicago Reader said that Schulze sounded "newly energized" on Deus Arrakis and praised the "pure-synth space daze" of the music, which includes several long, ambient soundscapes including the 32-minute "Seth". He called the album's closing composition, "Der Hauch des Lebens" (The Breath of Life), a "fitting epitaph" for an artist who knew that he was dying while working on this music: "To appreciate the slowly unfolding sonic colors of this visionary, atmospheric piece, you need patience, but your effort is well rewarded. Like any journey, whether in sci-fi or in life, it moves between realms of pure bliss and darker terrain."

Ludovic Hunter-Tilney of the Financial Times wrote that the album's "three lengthy instrumentals are a masterclass in old-fashioned cosmic music".

Henry Schneider of the website Exposé Online praised the album highly, calling it Schulze's "best release in decades, if not his entire career. ... Deus Arrakis is a wonderful posthumous achievement for the father of electronic music."

== Track listing ==
All tracks composed by Klaus Schulze.

No.	Title	Length
1.	"Osiris (Part 1–4)"	18:28
2.	"Seth (Part 1–7)"	31:47
3.	"Der Hauch des Lebens (Part 1–5)"	27:08

== Personnel ==
- Klaus Schulze – electronics
- Tom Dams – electronics
- Wolfgang Tiepold – cello on "Seth"
- Eva-Maria Kagermann – voice noises on "Der Hauch des Lebens"

== Charts ==
Chart performance for Deus Arrakis
Chart (2022)	Peak position
Belgian Albums (Ultratop Flanders)	168
German Albums (Offizielle Top 100)	2
Polish Albums (ZPAV)	44
Swiss Albums (Schweizer Hitparade)	21
