= Farscape (album) =

Studio album by Klaus Schulze, Lisa Gerrard
- Released: 4 July 2008
- Recorded: September–November 2007, in Hambühren
- Genre: Electronic music, space music
- Length: 153:30
- Label: SPV/Synthetic Symphony
- Producer: Klaus Schulze

Klaus Schulze chronology
Kontinuum (2007)	Farscape (2008)	Rheingold (2008)

Lisa Gerrard chronology
The Silver Tree (2006)	Farscape (2008)	Rheingold (2008)

Professional ratings
Review scores
Source	Rating
Allmusic	3.5/5 stars

Farscape is the thirty-seventh album by Klaus Schulze. It was originally released in 2008, and, taking in consideration the previously released multi-disc box sets (Silver Edition, Historic Edition, Jubilee Edition, Contemporary Works I, and Contemporary Works II), it could be viewed as Schulze's ninety-eighth album. This is the first Schulze album with guest singer Lisa Gerrard.

== Overview ==
Schulze explained the impetus for this album: "I have wanted to work with Lisa Gerrard since the days of Dead Can Dance, but I never had an opportunity for such a collaboration. It's also not so easy to reach her on the phone." Reciprocally, Gerrard said: "I know Klaus Schulze since Tangerine Dream. He is amazing, I mean, his work is sympathetic to a soul journey and has been for such a period of time."

Schulze prepared 300 minutes of music and scheduled 6 days with Gerrard for her to come to Hambühren: as Gerrard explained, "The important thing for me when I work with someone is that I go and listen to his music. All I did was go and improvise." The whole recording was actually done in two afternoons (on day 2 and 3) and half of the material was selected for the album. Schulze concluded, "Many people think good music has something to do with sweat and hard work, and it needs to last for months. However, my opinion is that if this is the case, the music is bad. Because if you are on the ball then you're just playing your best stuff."

== Track listing ==
All tracks composed by Klaus Schulze. All lyrics by Lisa Gerrard.

Disc 1
No.	Title	Length
1.	"Liquid Coincidence 1"	21:59
2.	"Liquid Coincidence 2"	30:51
3.	"Liquid Coincidence 3"	25:54

Disc 2
No.	Title	Length
1.	"Liquid Coincidence 4"	18:18
2.	"Liquid Coincidence 5"	18:48
3.	"Liquid Coincidence 6"	24:02
4.	"Liquid Coincidence 7"	13:38

== Personnel ==
Musical

- Klaus Schulze – keys
- Lisa Gerrard – voice

Technical

- Voice recording – Tom Dams

Graphical

- Cover, layout – Thomas Ewerhard
- Photos – Christian Piednoir, Peter Fitt
