= Rheingold (Klaus Schulze album) =

Live album by Klaus Schulze
- Released: 28 November 2008
- Recorded: Loreley, Germany on 18 July 2008 & Hambühren, Germany late summer 2008
- Genre: Space music, ambient
- Length: 132:17
- Label: SPV/InsideOut/Revisited
- Producer: Klaus Schulze

Klaus Schulze chronology
Farscape (2008)	Rheingold (2008)	Dziekuje Bardzo (2009)

Professional ratings
Review scores
Source	Rating
Allmusic	link

Rheingold is the thirty-eighth album by Klaus Schulze. It was originally released in 2008, and, taking in consideration the previously released multi-disc box sets (Silver Edition, Historic Edition, Jubilee Edition, Contemporary Works I, and Contemporary Works II), it could be viewed as Schulze's ninety-ninth album. This is the second Schulze album with guest vocalist Lisa Gerrard. It was recorded at an open-air concert in Loreley, Germany. There are several different iterations of this album: an edition of two CDs, an edition of two DVDs, and a limited edition of two CDs with two DVDs.

== Track listing ==
All tracks composed by Klaus Schulze. All lyrics by Lisa Gerrard.

Disc 1

No.	Title	Note	Length
1.	"Alberich"		24:54
2.	"Loreley"	vocals by Lisa Gerrard	39:35

Disc 2

No.	Title	Note	Length
1.	"Wotan"		10:03
2.	"Wellgunde"	vocals by Lisa Gerrard	14:56
3.	"Nothung"		11:20
4.	"Nibelungen"	bonus studio track	31:27
