= Moonlake =

Studio album by Klaus Schulze
- Released: 2005
- Recorded: 2003 & 2005
- Genre: Electronic music, space music, trance music
- Length: 74:04
- Label: Synthetic Symphony
- Producer: Klaus Schulze

Klaus Schulze chronology
| Live @ KlangArt (2001) | Moonlake (2005) | Kontinuum (2007) |

Moonlake is the thirty-fifth album by Klaus Schulze. It was originally released in 2005, and, taking in consideration the previously released multi-disc box sets (Silver Edition, Historic Edition, Jubilee Edition, Contemporary Works I, and Contemporary Works II), it could be viewed as Schulze's ninety-sixth album. The first two tracks were made in the studio; the last two are live.

Although the booklet states (as above) that "Same Thoughts Lion" and "Mephisto" are the remastered live tracks, there is a suggestion that it is "Mephisto" and the second half of "Playmate in Paradise" that are live, possibly from a performance in Poznan (Poland) on 5 November 2003.

== Track listing ==
All tracks composed by Klaus Schulze.

| No. | Title | Length |
|---|---|---|
| 1. | "Playmate in Paradise" | 30:07 |
| 2. | "Artemis in Jubileo" | 17:49 |
| 3. | "Same Thoughts Lion" | 10:38 |
| 4. | "Mephisto" | 15:23 |
