= Silhouettes (Klaus Schulze album) =

Studio album by Klaus Schulze
- Released: 25 May 2018
- Recorded: Summer 2017
- Genre: Space music; ambient; trance
- Length: 75:02
- Label: SPV
- Producer: Klaus Schulze

Klaus Schulze chronology
Eternal (2017)	Silhouettes (2018)	Next of Kin (2019)

Silhouettes is the forty-fifth album by Klaus Schulze, released on 25 May 2018. Taking in consideration the previously released multi-disc box sets (Silver Edition, Historic Edition, Jubilee Edition, Contemporary Works I, and Contemporary Works II), it could be viewed as Schulze's one hundred and sixth album. It was the first Klaus Schulze album to be made available on Bandcamp online music distributor.

== Track listing ==
All tracks composed by Klaus Schulze.

No.	Title	Length
1.	"Silhouettes"	15:41
2.	"Der lange Blick zurück"	22:07
3.	"Quae simplex"	21:47
4.	"Châteaux faits de vent"	15:08
