= Live @ KlangArt =

Live album by Klaus Schulze
- Released: 16 July 2001
- Recorded: 9 June 2001
- Genres: Electronic music, space music, trance music
- Length: 137:17 (original); 154:44 (reissue)
- Label: Rainhorse Records
- Producer: Klaus Schulze

Klaus Schulze chronology
Dosburg Online (1997)	Live @ KlangArt (2001)	Moonlake (2005)

Live @ KlangArt is the thirty-fourth album by Klaus Schulze. It was originally released in 2001 as two separate CDs, and in 2008 was the twenty-ninth and last Schulze album reissued by Revisited Records as a single album. Live @ KlangArt was released after Schulze's Silver Edition and Historic Edition 10-disc CD box sets, as well as Jubilee Edition 25-disc CD box set and Contemporary Works I 10-disc CD box set, technically making this album his eighty-ninth.

== Track listing ==
All tracks composed by Klaus Schulze.

Disc 1

No.	Title	Note	Length
1.	"Breeze to Sequence"	on original release	15:08
2.	"Loops to Groove"	on original release	12:58
3.	"From Church to Search"	on original release	14:06
4.	"I Loop You Schwindelig"	on original release	27:59
5.	"Short Romance"	reissue bonus track	5:44

Disc 2

No.	Title	Note	Length
1.	"La Fugue Sequenca"	on original release	21:59
2.	"Cavalleria Cellisticana"	on original release	21:51
3.	"Tracks of Desire"	on original release	9:13
4.	"Last Move at Osnabrück"	on original release	13:36
5.	"OS 9.07"	reissue bonus track	12:23
