= Kontinuum (album) =

Studio album by Klaus Schulze
- Released: 7 June 2007
- Recorded: 2006–2007
- Genre: Space music, ambient, trance
- Length: 76:22
- Label: SPV/InsideOut/Revisited
- Producer: Klaus Schulze

Klaus Schulze chronology
Moonlake (2005)	Kontinuum (2007)	Farscape (2008)

Kontinuum is the thirty-sixth album by Klaus Schulze. It was originally released in 2007, and, taking in consideration the previously released multi-disc box sets (Silver Edition, Historic Edition, Jubilee Edition, Contemporary Works I, and Contemporary Works II), it could be viewed as Schulze's ninety-seventh album.

== Track listing ==
All tracks composed by Klaus Schulze.

No.	Title	Length
1.	"Sequenzer (From 70 to 07)"	24:54
2.	"Euro Caravan"	19:41
3.	"Thor (Thunder)"	31:47
