= Dosburg Online =

Studio album by Klaus Schulze
- Released: November 24, 1997
- Recorded: 1997
- Genres: Electronic music, space music, trance
- Length: 79:14
- Label: WEA
- Producer: Klaus Schulze

Klaus Schulze chronology
Are You Sequenced? (1996)	Dosburg Online (1997)	Live @ KlangArt (2001)

Dosburg Online is the thirty-third album by Klaus Schulze. It was released in 1997, and in 2006 was the twenty-first Schulze album reissued by Revisited Records. Dosburg Online was released after Schulze's Silver Edition and Historic Edition 10-disc CD box sets, as well as Jubilee Edition 25-disc CD box set, technically making this album his seventy-eighth. This is the second of two reissues not to feature a bonus track (the other being Miditerranean Pads).

== Track listing ==
All tracks composed by Klaus Schulze, except where noted.

No.	Title	Length
1.	"L'Age core"	11:50
2.	"Requiem fürs Revier" (writers: Klaus Schulze, Lorraine Oostwoud)	15:01
3.	"Groove'n'Bass"	6:16
4.	"Get Sequenced"	3:28
5.	"The Power of Moog"	4:47
6.	"Up, Up and Away"	8:21
7.	"From Dawn Til Dusk"	4:01
8.	"The Art of Sequencing"	18:21
9.	"Primavera" (writers: Klaus Schulze, Lorraine Oostwoud)	7:02

== Personnel ==
- Klaus Schulze – keyboards, drum machine, sequencers
- Jorg Schaaf – keyboards, sequencers
- Roelof Oostwoud – operatic vocals
