= La Vie Electronique =

La Vie Electronique is a series of multi-disc CD releases by Klaus Schulze, reissuing material from his limited edition 50-disc CD box set The Ultimate Edition (2000), which itself collected the previously released limited edition multi-disc box sets Silver Edition (1993, 10 discs), Historic Edition (1995, 10 discs), and Jubilee Edition (1997, 25 discs), along with an additional 5 discs. The series began in 2009 with a plan to release all the music from The Ultimate Edition in chronological order. Four volumes were released in 2009, and four more were released in 2010. The next two volumes were released in 2011, with the next two following in 2012. The thirteenth volume was released in 2013, and the fourteenth and fifteenth volumes in 2014. The sixteenth and final volume, containing five CDs rather than the usual three, was released on May 29, 2015.

One noticeable difference between the original box sets and the La Vie Electronique reissues is the indexing of the discs themselves. While the individual movements of longer pieces were indicated in the sleeve notes of the box sets, those compositions were presented as one continuous track. On the new editions, separate track indexing points are given to each of these sections.

Four tracks from the original box editions are not present within the La Vie Electronique series: two from The Ultimate Edition ("Ballet pour le Docteur Faustus" and "Discover Trakl") and two from the Jubilee Edition ("The Unspoken Thing" and "Ludwigs Traum"). The latter two selections were also not repeated in The Ultimate Edition set, though both are in fact variations of "Ballet pour Le Docteur Faustus". Similarly, "Discover Trakl" is an extended version of the track "George Trakl" from the 1978 album X, and this longer version (in a slightly edited form) was included in place of the original on that album's 2005 reissue.

== La Vie Electronique 1 ==
La Vie Electronique 1

Box set by Klaus Schulze
- Released: February 6, 2009
- Genres: Electronic music, space music
- Label: Revisited Records
- Producer: Klaus Schulze

Disc 1

| No. | Title | Note | Length |
|---|---|---|---|
| 1. | "I was Dreaming I was Awake and Then I Woke up and Found Myself Asleep" | slightly different version of "Neuronengesang" (Cyborg) | 24:51 |
| 2. | "The Real McCoy" | The Ultimate Edition (CD 20), originally Historic Edition (CD 10) | 12:54 |
| 3. | "Tempus Fugit" | The Ultimate Edition (CD 14), originally Historic Edition (CD 4) | 26:24 |
| 4. | "Dynamo" | The Ultimate Edition (CD 17), originally Historic Edition (CD 7) | 14:19 |
| 5. | "Interview 1970" | appeared on The Private Tapes Vol. 2 by Ash Ra Tempel | 0:24 |

Disc 2

| No. | Title | Note | Length |
|---|---|---|---|
| 1. | "Traumraum" | The Ultimate Edition (CD 20), originally Historic Edition (CD 10) | 31:36 |
| 2. | "Study for Brian Eno" | The Ultimate Edition (CD 36), originally Jubilee Edition (CD 16) | 7:20 |
| 3. | "Cyborgs Traum" | The Ultimate Edition (CD 27), originally Jubilee Edition (CD 7) | 39:15 |

Disc 3

| No. | Title | Note | Length |
|---|---|---|---|
| 1. | "Die Kunst, Hundert Jahre alt zu Werden" | The Ultimate Edition (CD 30), originally Jubilee Edition (CD 10) | 64:09 |
| 2. | "Study for Terry Riley" | The Ultimate Edition (CD 37), originally Jubilee Edition (CD 17) | 5:08 |
| 3. | "Les Jockeys Camouflés" | The Ultimate Edition (CD 30), originally Jubilee Edition (CD 10) | 8:03 |

== La Vie Electronique 2 ==
La Vie Electronique 2

Box set by Klaus Schulze
- Released: February 6, 2009
- Genres: Electronic music, space music
- Label: Revisited Records
- Producer: Klaus Schulze

Disc 1

| No. | Title | Note | Length |
|---|---|---|---|
| 1. | "North of the Yukon" | The Ultimate Edition (CD 32), originally Jubilee Edition (CD 12) | 20:43 |
| 2. | "Nightwind" | The Ultimate Edition (CD 36), originally Jubilee Edition (CD 16) | 16:14 |
| 3. | "Minuet" | The Ultimate Edition (CD 36), originally Jubilee Edition (CD 16) | 11:38 |
| 4. | "Signs of Dawn" | The Ultimate Edition (CD 36), originally Jubilee Edition (CD 16) | 22:38 |
| 5. | "Study for Philip K. Dick" | The Ultimate Edition (CD 36), originally Jubilee Edition (CD 16) | 8:31 |

Disc 2

| No. | Title | Note | Length |
|---|---|---|---|
| 1. | "Das große Identifikationsspiel" | The Ultimate Edition (CD 33), originally Jubilee Edition (CD 13) | 41:53 |
| 2. | "Titanensee" | The Ultimate Edition (CD 32), originally Jubilee Edition (CD 12) | 27:07 |
| 3. | "Electric Love-Affair" | The Ultimate Edition (CD 14), originally Historic Edition (CD 4) | 10:47 |

Disc 3

| No. | Title | Note | Length |
|---|---|---|---|
| 1. | "Land der leeren Häuser" | The Ultimate Edition (CD 32), originally Jubilee Edition (CD 12) | 11:14 |
| 2. | "Studies for Organ, Keyboards and Drumset" | The Ultimate Edition (CD 32), originally Jubilee Edition (CD 12) | 14:51 |
| 3. | "Memento Mori" | The Ultimate Edition (CD 20), originally Historic Edition (CD 10) | 9:08 |
| 4. | "Blaue Stunde" | The Ultimate Edition (CD 43), originally Jubilee Edition (CD 22) | 37:52 |

== La Vie Electronique 3 ==
La Vie Electronique 3

Box set by Klaus Schulze
- Released: August 7, 2009
- Genres: Electronic music, space music
- Label: Revisited Records
- Producer: Klaus Schulze

Disc 1

| No. | Title | Note | Length |
|---|---|---|---|
| 1. | "Alles ist gut" | The Ultimate Edition (CD 13), originally Historic Edition (CD 3) | 36:19 |
| 2. | "Well Roared, Lion!" | The Ultimate Edition (CD 13), originally Historic Edition (CD 3) | 9:21 |
| 3. | "Der Blaue Glaube" | The Ultimate Edition (CD 13), originally Historic Edition (CD 3) | 32:17 |

Disc 2

| No. | Title | Note | Length |
|---|---|---|---|
| 1. | "Fourneau Cosmique" | The Ultimate Edition (CD 18), originally Historic Edition (CD 8) | 25:35 |
| 2. | "Die lebendige Spur" | The Ultimate Edition (CD 3), originally Silver Edition (CD 3) | 12:45 |
| 3. | "La présence d'esprit" | The Ultimate Edition (CD 9), originally Silver Edition (CD 9) | 17:35 |
| 4. | "Der Lauf der Dinge" | The Ultimate Edition (CD 20), originally Historic Edition (CD 10) | 20:47 |

Disc 3

| No. | Title | Note | Length |
|---|---|---|---|
| 1. | "Zeichen meines Lebens" | The Ultimate Edition (CD 15), originally Historic Edition (CD 5) | 32:09 |
| 2. | "Semper idem" | The Ultimate Edition (CD 26), originally Jubilee Edition (CD 6) | 11:37 |
| 3. | "Wann soll man springen?" | The Ultimate Edition (CD 26), originally Jubilee Edition (CD 6) | 15:07 |
| 4. | "Experimentelle Bagatelle" | The Ultimate Edition (CD 29), originally Jubilee Edition (CD 9) | 4:11 |
| 5. | "Kurzes Stück im alten Stil" | The Ultimate Edition (CD 33), originally Jubilee Edition (CD 13) | 7:02 |
| 6. | "Gewitter" | The Ultimate Edition (CD 14), originally Historic Edition (CD 4) | 9:23 |

== La Vie Electronique 4 ==
La Vie Electronique 4

Box set by Klaus Schulze
- Released: August 7, 2009
- Genres: Electronic music, space music
- Label: Revisited Records
- Producer: Klaus Schulze

Disc 1

| No. | Title | Note | Length |
|---|---|---|---|
| 1. | "Just an Old-Fashioned Schulze Track" | The Ultimate Edition (CD 48) | 73:28 |

Disc 2

| No. | Title | Note | Length |
|---|---|---|---|
| 1. | "Shadow Piece" | The Ultimate Edition (CD 34), originally Jubilee Edition (CD 14) | 13:10 |
| 2. | "I Sing the Body Electric" | The Ultimate Edition (CD 12), originally Historic Edition (CD 2) | 49:15 |
| 3. | "Das Herz von Grönland" | The Ultimate Edition (CD 12), originally Historic Edition (CD 2) | 14:16 |

Disc 3

| No. | Title | Note | Length |
|---|---|---|---|
| 1. | "The Andromeda Strain" | The Ultimate Edition (CD 16), originally Historic Edition (CD 6) | 41:46 |
| 2. | "Make Room, Make Room!" | The Ultimate Edition (CD 16), originally Historic Edition (CD 6) | 28:57 |
| 3. | "Darkest Steglitz" | The Ultimate Edition (CD 41) | 7:43 |

== La Vie Electronique 5 ==
La Vie Electronique 5

Box set by Klaus Schulze
- Released: June 25, 2010
- Genres: Electronic music, space music
- Label: MIG Music
- Producer: Klaus Schulze

Disc 1

| No. | Title | Note | Length |
|---|---|---|---|
| 1. | "Berlin Schöneberg" | The Ultimate Edition (CD 41) | 24:15 |
| 2. | "Vie de rêve" | The Ultimate Edition (CD 28), originally Jubilee Edition (CD 8) | 48:56 |

Disc 2

| No. | Title | Note | Length |
|---|---|---|---|
| 1. | "Nostalgic Echo" | The Ultimate Edition (CD 3), originally Silver Edition (CD 3) | 34:10 |
| 2. | "Titanische Tage" | The Ultimate Edition (CD 3), originally Silver Edition (CD 3) | 27:16 |
| 3. | "For Barry Graves" | The Ultimate Edition (CD 42) (14:29) | 15:38 |

Disc 3

| No. | Title | Note | Length |
|---|---|---|---|
| 1. | "The Poet" | The Ultimate Edition (CD 18), originally Historic Edition (CD 8) | 52:48 |
| 2. | "The Oberhausen Tape" | The Ultimate Edition (CD 34), originally Jubilee Edition (CD 14) | 23:04 |

== La Vie Electronique 6 ==
La Vie Electronique 6

Box set by Klaus Schulze
- Released: June 25, 2010
- Genres: Electronic music, space music
- Label: MIG Music
- Producer: Klaus Schulze

Disc 1

| No. | Title | Note | Length |
|---|---|---|---|
| 1. | "The Other Oberhausen Tape" | The Ultimate Edition (CD 34), originally Jubilee Edition (CD 14) | 22:03 |
| 2. | "Schwanensee I" | The Ultimate Edition (CD 19), originally Historic Edition (CD 9) | 26:48 |
| 3. | "Schwanensee II" | The Ultimate Edition (CD 19), originally Historic Edition (CD 9) | 21:00 |
| 4. | "Fear at Madame Tussaud's" | The Ultimate Edition (CD 31), originally Jubilee Edition (CD 11) | 6:23 |

Disc 2

| No. | Title | Note | Length |
|---|---|---|---|
| 1. | "Zeit Geist" | The Ultimate Edition (CD 11), originally Historic Edition (CD 1) | 50:36 |
| 2. | "Inside the Harlequin" | The Ultimate Edition (CD 12), originally Historic Edition (CD 2) (12:19) | 26:16 |

Disc 3

| No. | Title | Note | Length |
|---|---|---|---|
| 1. | "La vie secrète" | The Ultimate Edition (CD 10), originally Silver Edition (CD 10) | 62:20 |
| 2. | "Barracuda Drum" | previously unreleased | 8:47 |
| 3. | "There was Greatness in the Room" | The Ultimate Edition (CD 28), originally Jubilee Edition (CD 8) | 8:31 |

== La Vie Electronique 7 ==
La Vie Electronique 7

Box set by Klaus Schulze
- Released: July 30, 2010
- Genres: Electronic music, space music
- Label: MIG Music
- Producer: Klaus Schulze

Disc 1

| No. | Title | Note | Length |
|---|---|---|---|
| 1. | "Re: People I Know" | The Ultimate Edition (CD 22), originally Jubilee Edition (CD 2) | 40:24 |
| 2. | "Avec Arthur" | The Ultimate Edition (CD 22), originally Jubilee Edition (CD 2) | 37:34 |

Disc 2

| No. | Title | Note | Length |
|---|---|---|---|
| 1. | "Crazy Nietzsche" | The Ultimate Edition (CD 47) | 43:16 |
| 2. | "The Future" | The Ultimate Edition (CD 14), originally Historic Edition (CD 4) | 28:19 |
| 3. | "Interview 1979" | The Ultimate Edition (CD 36), originally Jubilee Edition (CD 16) | 2:30 |

Disc 3

| No. | Title | Note | Length |
|---|---|---|---|
| 1. | "My Virtual Principles" | The Ultimate Edition (CD 17), originally Historic Edition (CD 7) | 62:53 |
| 2. | "Die Erde ist rund" | The Ultimate Edition (CD 34), originally Jubilee Edition (CD 14) | 11:56 |

== La Vie Electronique 8 ==
La Vie Electronique 8

Box set by Klaus Schulze
- Released: August 27, 2010
- Genres: Electronic music, space music
- Label: MIG Music
- Producer: Klaus Schulze

Disc 1

| No. | Title | Note | Length |
|---|---|---|---|
| 1. | "Dans un jardin" | The Ultimate Edition (CD 37), originally Jubilee Edition (CD 17) | 40:02 |
| 2. | "Faster than Lightning" | The Ultimate Edition (CD 37), originally Jubilee Edition (CD 17) | 29:55 |
| 3. | "Phonetisches Plakat" | The Ultimate Edition (CD 36), originally Jubilee Edition (CD 16) | 6:56 |

Disc 2

| No. | Title | Note | Length |
|---|---|---|---|
| 1. | "Hitchcock Suite" | The Ultimate Edition (CD 26), originally Jubilee Edition (CD 6) | 40:12 |
| 2. | "L'affaire Tournesol" | The Ultimate Edition (CD 28), originally Jubilee Edition (CD 8) | 19:38 |
| 3. | "Bona Fide" | The Ultimate Edition (CD 40), originally Jubilee Edition (CD 24) | 14:33 |
| 4. | "Interview 1980" | previously unreleased | 4:57 |

Disc 3

| No. | Title | Note | Length |
|---|---|---|---|
| 1. | "Keep up with the Times" | The Ultimate Edition (CD 31), originally Jubilee Edition (CD 11) | 16:13 |
| 2. | "I Remember Rahsaan" | The Ultimate Edition (CD 32), originally Jubilee Edition (CD 12) | 5:22 |
| 3. | "A Quick One" | The Ultimate Edition (CD 43), originally Jubilee Edition (CD 22) | 3:51 |
| 4. | "Count Me In" | The Ultimate Edition (CD 43), originally Jubilee Edition (CD 22) | 4:04 |
| 5. | "The Martial Law" | The Ultimate Edition (CD 43), originally Jubilee Edition (CD 22) | 31:23 |
| 6. | "Zugabe Timbales" | previously unreleased | 12:27 |
| 7. | "Interview 1982" | slightly longer (6:00) on The Ultimate Edition (CD 30), originally Jubilee Edition (CD 10) | 5:44 |

== La Vie Electronique 9 ==
La Vie Electronique 9

Box set by Klaus Schulze
- Released: March 25, 2011
- Genres: Electronic music, space music
- Label: MIG Music
- Producer: Klaus Schulze

Disc 1

| No. | Title | Note | Length |
|---|---|---|---|
| 1. | "Ludwig Revisited" | The Ultimate Edition (CD 23), originally Jubilee Edition (CD 3) | 21:30 |
| 2. | "Peg Leg Dance" | The Ultimate Edition (CD 23), originally Jubilee Edition (CD 3) | 39:21 |
| 3. | "Die spirituelle Kraft des Augenblicks" | The Ultimate Edition (CD 23), originally Jubilee Edition (CD 3) | 15:32 |

Disc 2

| No. | Title | Note | Length |
|---|---|---|---|
| 1. | "Seltsam statisch" | The Ultimate Edition (CD 38), originally Jubilee Edition (CD 18) | 21:32 |
| 2. | "Verblüffe sie!" | The Ultimate Edition (CD 38), originally Jubilee Edition (CD 18) | 34:22 |
| 3. | "Kompromisslose Inventions" | The Ultimate Edition (CD 38), originally Jubilee Edition (CD 18) | 15:50 |
| 4. | "Interview 1984" | The Ultimate Edition (CD 34), originally Jubilee Edition (CD 14) | 7:10 |

Disc 3

| No. | Title | Note | Length |
|---|---|---|---|
| 1. | "National Radio Waves" | The Ultimate Edition (CD 39), originally Jubilee Edition (CD 20) | 53:05 |
| 2. | "The Midas Touch" | The Ultimate Edition (CD 39), originally Jubilee Edition (CD 20) | 20:12 |
| 3. | "Interview 1984" | The Ultimate Edition (CD 39), originally Jubilee Edition (CD 20) | 4:00 |

== La Vie Electronique 10 ==
La Vie Electronique 10

Box set by Klaus Schulze
- Released: June 24, 2011
- Genres: Electronic music, space music
- Label: MIG Music
- Producer: Klaus Schulze

Disc 1

| No. | Title | Note | Length |
|---|---|---|---|
| 1. | "Unheilbar Deutsch" | The Ultimate Edition (CD 35), originally Jubilee Edition (CD 15) | 53:53 |
| 2. | "Maxxi" | The Ultimate Edition (CD 38), originally Jubilee Edition (CD 18) | 7:45 |
| 3. | "Weiter, weiter!" | previously unreleased | 10:37 |

Disc 2

| No. | Title | Note | Length |
|---|---|---|---|
| 1. | "Walk the Edge" | The Ultimate Edition (CD 41), originally Jubilee Edition (CD 21) | 46:30 |
| 2. | "Havlandet" | The Ultimate Edition (CD 19), originally Historic Edition (CD 9) | 27:08 |
| 3. | "Interview 1991" | previously unreleased | 4:56 |

Disc 3

| No. | Title | Note | Length |
|---|---|---|---|
| 1. | "Goodwill" | The Ultimate Edition (CD 29), originally Jubilee Edition (CD 9) | 13:04 |
| 2. | "Olé!" | The Ultimate Edition (CD 31), originally Jubilee Edition (CD 11) | 16:30 |
| 3. | "Habla Español?" | The Ultimate Edition (CD 31), originally Jubilee Edition (CD 11) | 17:27 |
| 4. | "Gaudi Gaudi" | The Ultimate Edition (CD 31), originally Jubilee Edition (CD 11) | 23:13 |
| 5. | "Suite Nr. 3, D-Dur, 2. Satz "Air"" | The Ultimate Edition (CD 42), originally Jubilee Edition (CD 19) | 8:00 |

== La Vie Electronique 11 ==
La Vie Electronique 11

Box set by Klaus Schulze
- Released: April 27, 2012
- Genres: Electronic music, space music
- Label: MIG Music
- Producer: Klaus Schulze

Disc 1

| No. | Title | Note | Length |
|---|---|---|---|
| 1. | "Film Musik" | The Ultimate Edition (CD 1), originally Silver Edition (CD 1) | 75:26 |

Disc 2

| No. | Title | Note | Length |
|---|---|---|---|
| 1. | "Narren des Schicksals" | The Ultimate Edition (CD 2), originally Silver Edition (CD 2) | 71:13 |

Disc 3

| No. | Title | Note | Length |
|---|---|---|---|
| 1. | "Der Schönheit Spur" | The Ultimate Edition (CD 4), originally Silver Edition (CD 4) | 37:36 |
| 2. | "Ein schönes Autodafé" | The Ultimate Edition (CD 4), originally Silver Edition (CD 4) | 21:24 |
| 3. | "Return in Happy Plight" | The Ultimate Edition (CD 4), originally Silver Edition (CD 4) | 19:08 |

== La Vie Electronique 12 ==
La Vie Electronique 12

Box set by Klaus Schulze
- Released: October 26, 2012
- Genres: Electronic music, space music
- Label: MIG Music
- Producer: Klaus Schulze

Disc 1

| No. | Title | Note | Length |
|---|---|---|---|
| 1. | "Picasso Geht Spazieren: First Movement" | The Ultimate Edition (CD 5), originally Silver Edition (CD 5) | 78:40 |

Disc 2

| No. | Title | Note | Length |
|---|---|---|---|
| 1. | "Picasso Geht Spazieren: Second Movement" | The Ultimate Edition (CD 6), originally Silver Edition (CD 6) | 15:36 |
| 2. | "Picasso Geht Spazieren: Third Movement" | The Ultimate Edition (CD 6), originally Silver Edition (CD 6) | 60:12 |

Disc 3

| No. | Title | Note | Length |
|---|---|---|---|
| 1. | "The Music Box" | The Ultimate Edition (CD 7), originally 73:55 on Silver Edition (CD 7) | 79:13 |

== La Vie Electronique 13 ==
La Vie Electronique 13

Box set by Klaus Schulze
- Released: April 26, 2013
- Genres: Electronic music, space music
- Label: MIG Music
- Producer: Klaus Schulze

Disc 1

| No. | Title | Note | Length |
|---|---|---|---|
| 1. | "Machine de plaisir" | The Ultimate Edition (CD 8), originally 73:51 on Silver Edition (CD 8) | 78:32 |

Disc 2

| No. | Title | Note | Length |
|---|---|---|---|
| 1. | "Tag des offenen Denkmals" | The Ultimate Edition (CD 30), originally Jubilee Edition (CD 10) | 0:30 |
| 2. | "Himmel und Erde (Remix)" | The Ultimate Edition (CD 50) | 7:07 |
| 3. | "Vas Insigne Electionis" | The Ultimate Edition (CD 50) | 9:47 |
| 4. | "Arthur Stanley Jefferson" | The Ultimate Edition (CD 9), originally Silver Edition (CD 9) | 56:56 |

Disc 3

| No. | Title | Note | Length |
|---|---|---|---|
| 1. | "Borrowed Time" | The Ultimate Edition (CD 24), originally Jubilee Edition (CD 4) | 77:12 |

== La Vie Electronique 14 ==
La Vie Electronique 14

Box set by Klaus Schulze
- Released: January 31, 2014
- Genres: Electronic music, space music
- Label: MIG Music
- Producer: Klaus Schulze

Disc 1

| No. | Title | Note | Length |
|---|---|---|---|
| 1. | "Opera Trance" | The Ultimate Edition (CD 25), originally Jubilee Edition (CD 5) | 79:21 |

Disc 2

| No. | Title | Note | Length |
|---|---|---|---|
| 1. | "Zooblast" | The Ultimate Edition (CD 48) | 3:11 |
| 2. | "Conquest of Paradise (Long Version)" | Released as a single in 1994, not collected in The Ultimate Edition | 4:48 |
| 3. | "Große Gaukler Gottes" | The Ultimate Edition (CD 50) | 5:24 |
| 4. | "Angry Young Moog" | The Ultimate Edition (CD 33), originally Jubilee Edition (CD 13) | 8:04 |
| 5. | "Kosmisches Gleiteisen" | The Ultimate Edition (CD 33), originally Jubilee Edition (CD 13) | 3:44 |
| 6. | "Operatic March" | The Ultimate Edition (CD 33), originally Jubilee Edition (CD 13) | 3:42 |
| 7. | "Kosmisches Gleiteisen, pt. 2" | The Ultimate Edition (CD 33), originally Jubilee Edition (CD 13) | 1:57 |
| 8. | "Angry Young Moog, pt. 2" | The Ultimate Edition (CD 33), originally Jubilee Edition (CD 13) | 13:15 |
| 9. | "Dreieinhalb Stunden" | The Ultimate Edition (CD 50) | 4:28 |
| 10. | "The Schulzendorf Groove (First Version)" | The Ultimate Edition (CD 50) | 11:34 |
| 11. | "The Schulzendorf Groove (Tribute Version)" | Released on a compilation in 1998, not collected in The Ultimate Edition | 14:04 |
| 12. | "Man at Work" | Released on a compilation in 1999, not collected in The Ultimate Edition | 2:34 |

Disc 3

| No. | Title | Note | Length |
|---|---|---|---|
| 1. | "Tradition and Vision" | The Ultimate Edition (CD 21), originally Jubilee Edition (CD 1) | 78:45 |

== La Vie Electronique 15 ==
La Vie Electronique 15

Box set by Klaus Schulze
- Released: March 28, 2014
- Genres: Electronic music, space music
- Label: MIG Music
- Producer: Klaus Schulze

Disc 1

| No. | Title | Note | Length |
|---|---|---|---|
| 1. | "'Nuff Said!" | The Ultimate Edition (CD 45), originally Jubilee Edition (CD 25) | 79:06 |

Disc 2

| No. | Title | Note | Length |
|---|---|---|---|
| 1. | "L'opera aperta" | The Ultimate Edition (CD 46) | 49:43 |
| 2. | "La tolleranza" | The Ultimate Edition (CD 46) | 15:24 |
| 3. | "Time Goes By" | The Ultimate Edition (CD 46) | 12:22 |

Disc 3

| No. | Title | Note | Length |
|---|---|---|---|
| 1. | "Cum cello spiritu" | The Ultimate Edition (CD 49) | 26:40 |
| 2. | "Cellingua" | The Ultimate Edition (CD 49) | 27:40 |
| 3. | "Cello cum laude" | The Ultimate Edition (CD 49) | 24:18 |

== La Vie Electronique 16 ==
La Vie Electronique 16

Box set by Klaus Schulze
- Released: May 29, 2015
- Genres: Electronic music, space music
- Label: MIG Music
- Producer: Klaus Schulze

Disc 1

| No. | Title | Note | Length |
|---|---|---|---|
| 1. | "Chinese Eyes" | Released on bonus CD of Contemporary Works II | 13:20 |
| 2. | "Landpartie" | The Ultimate Edition (CD 10), originally Silver Edition (CD 10) | 10:47 |
| 3. | "Berlin Zehlendorf" | The Ultimate Edition (CD 50) | 12:22 |
| 4. | "Get the Car, Harry" | The Ultimate Edition (CD 42) | 19:05 |
| 5. | "Acta Non Verba" | previously unreleased | 9:57 |

Disc 2

| No. | Title | Note | Length |
|---|---|---|---|
| 1. | "Der Ursprung der Welt" | The Ultimate Edition (CD 44), originally Jubilee Edition (CD 23) | 26:26 |
| 2. | "Midnight at Madame Tussaud's" | The Ultimate Edition (CD 44), originally Jubilee Edition (CD 23) | 16:20 |
| 3. | "Totally Wired" | The Ultimate Edition (CD 44), originally Jubilee Edition (CD 23) | 34:02 |

Disc 3

| No. | Title | Note | Length |
|---|---|---|---|
| 1. | "And Now For Something Completely Different" | The Ultimate Edition (CD 15), originally Historic Edition (CD 5) | 0:38 |
| 2. | "From and To" | The Ultimate Edition (CD 11), originally Historic Edition (CD 1) | 20:40 |
| 3. | "Leiden mit Manu" | The Ultimate Edition (CD 15), originally Historic Edition (CD 5) | 38:31 |
| 4. | "Face of Mae West" | The Ultimate Edition (CD 50) | 8:16 |
| 5. | "Trakl Sans Vox" | previously unreleased | 8:34 |

Disc 4

| No. | Title | Note | Length |
|---|---|---|---|
| 1. | "Der Welt Lauf" | The Ultimate Edition (CD 29), originally Jubilee Edition (CD 9) | 41:50 |
| 2. | "Ein ruhiger Nachmittag" | The Ultimate Edition (CD 42), originally Jubilee Edition (CD 19) | 31:22 |
| 3. | "Totemfeuer Live" | previously unreleased | 3:39 |

Disc 5

| No. | Title | Note | Length |
|---|---|---|---|
| 1. | "Whales" | The Ultimate Edition (CD 29), originally Jubilee Edition (CD 9) | 19:51 |
| 2. | "Unikat" | The Ultimate Edition (CD 50) | 11:26 |
| 3. | "Das Lyrische Ich" | previously unreleased | 16:19 |
| 4. | "Melange" | Released on a compilation in 2000, not collected in The Ultimate Edition | 6:52 |
| 5. | "Just Skins" | The Ultimate Edition (CD 35), originally Jubilee Edition (CD 15) | 24:39 |
