= In Blue (Klaus Schulze album) =

Studio album by Klaus Schulze
- Released: February 28, 1995
- Recorded: November, December 1994
- Genre: Electronic music, space music
- Length: 157:22 (original); 210:35 (reissue)
- Label: ZYX
- Producer: Klaus Schulze

Klaus Schulze chronology
Das Wagner Desaster Live (1994)	In Blue (1995)	Are You Sequenced? (1996)

Professional ratings
Review scores
Source	Rating
Allmusic	3/5 stars

In Blue is the thirty-first album by Klaus Schulze. It was originally released in 1995, and in 2005 was the eighth Schulze album reissued by Revisited Records. In Blue was released after Schulze's Silver Edition 10-disc CD box set, technically making this album his forty-first.

== Track listing ==
All tracks composed by Klaus Schulze.

Disc 1

No.	Title	Note	Length
1.	"Into the Blue"	on original release	78:25

Disc 2

No.	Title	Note	Length
1.	"Return of the Tempel"	on original release	44:38
2.	"Serenade in Blue"	on original release	34:19

Disc 3

No.	Title	Note	Length
1.	"Musique Abstract"	reissue bonus track	7:02
2.	"Return of the Tempel 2"	reissue bonus track	13:51
3.	"Out of the Blue 2"	reissue bonus track	32:20
