= Dune (Klaus Schulze album) =

Studio album by Klaus Schulze
- Released: 1979
- Recorded: April and May 1979
- Genre: Electronic music, space music
- Length: 56:23 (original); 79:26 (reissue)
- Label: Brain
- Producer: Klaus Schulze

Klaus Schulze chronology
| X (1978) | Dune (1979) | ...Live.... (1980) |

Professional ratings
Review scores
| Source | Rating |
|---|---|
| AllMusic | 4/5 stars |

Dune is the eleventh album by Klaus Schulze. It was originally released in 1979, and in 2005 was the tenth Schulze album reissued by Revisited Records. "Shadows of Ignorance" features Arthur Brown on vocals, half-singing/half-chanting a long poem written by Schulze.

The cover photograph was taken by Schulze himself, who arranged black letters on a television screen and took a snapshot during a scene of the Soviet science fiction film Solaris.

The album was inspired in part by the 1965 Frank Herbert science-fiction novel Dune, which was a lifelong source of inspiration for Schulze; his previous album X featured a track dedicated to Herbert; his final album, 2022's Deus Arrakis, was also inspired by the book, and Schulze also contributed to Hans Zimmer's soundtrack for Denis Villeneuve's 2021 film adaptation.

== Track listing ==
All tracks composed by Klaus Schulze.

Side one
| No. | Title | Length |
|---|---|---|
| 1. | "Dune" | 30:28 |

Side two
| No. | Title | Length |
|---|---|---|
| 1. | "Shadows of Ignorance" | 26:20 |

2005 Revisited Records bonus track
| No. | Title | Length |
|---|---|---|
| 3. | "Le Mans" | 23:03 |

== Personnel ==
- Klaus Schulze – electronics, lyrics on "Shadows of Ignorance"
- Arthur Brown – vocals on "Shadows of Ignorance"
- Wolfgang Tiepold – cello
