= Miditerranean Pads =

Studio album by Klaus Schulze
- Released: February 28, 1990
- Recorded: 1989
- Genres: Electronic music, space music
- Length: 69:58 (original); 71:58 (reissue)
- Label: Brain Records
- Producer: Klaus Schulze

Klaus Schulze chronology
| En=Trance (1988) | Miditerranean Pads (1990) | The Dresden Performance (1990) |

Professional ratings
Review scores
| Source | Rating |
|---|---|
| Allmusic | 4/5 stars |

Miditerranean Pads is the twenty-first album by Klaus Schulze. It was originally released in 1990, and in 2005 was the twelfth Schulze album reissued by Revisited Records. This is the first of two reissues not to feature a bonus track (the other being Dosburg Online), though the first track is extended by two minutes.

== Track listing ==
All tracks are written by Klaus Schulze.

| No. | Title | Note | Length |
|---|---|---|---|
| 1. | "Decent Changes" | 25:15 on vinyl release, 32:45 on deluxe edition | 30:45 |
| 2. | "Miditerranean Pads" | not on vinyl release | 14:12 |
| 3. | "Percussion Planante" | | 25:01 |
