= Trance Appeal =

Studio album by Wahnfried
- Released: 7 May 1996
- Recorded: July–August 1995 in Hambühren
- Genre: Electronic music, space music, trance music
- Length: 62:41 (original); 75:53 (2007 reissue)
- Label: Metronome
- Producer: Klaus Schulze

Wahnfried chronology
Trancelation (1994)	Trance Appeal (1996)	Drums 'n' Balls (The Gancha Dub) (1997)

Professional ratings
Review scores
Source	Rating
Allmusic	4/5 stars

Trance Appeal is the sixth album by Klaus Schulze under the alias Richard Wahnfried (or just Wahnfried in this case), released in 1996.

== Track listing ==
All tracks composed by Klaus Schulze and Jörg Schaaf, except where noted.

No.	Title	Note	Length
1.	"Suspense"	on original release	3:40
2.	"Bizarre"	on original release	5:43
3.	"Rubbish"	on original release	4:06
4.	"Angel Heart"	on original release	8:50
5.	"So What?"	on original release	3:43
6.	"Towarisch"	on original release	4:06
7.	"Das Mädchen mag es"	on original release	2:20
8.	"A Chilly Fiesta"	on original release	9:34
9.	"Espirit sans frontières"	on original release	8:37
10.	"Psychedelic Clubbing"	on original release	9:00
11.	"Le Sleep des Animaux"	on original release	3:02
12.	"Marooned" (Schulze)	reissue bonus track	13:12

== Personnel ==
- Klaus Schulze – Electronics, keyboards
- Jörg Schaaf – Computer programming, keyboards
