= The Ultimate Edition =

Box set by Klaus Schulze
- Released: 1 January 2000
- Recorded: 1970–1999
- Genres: Electronic music, space music
- Label: Série Poème
- Producer: Klaus Schulze

The Ultimate Edition is a limited edition 50-disc CD box set released by Klaus Schulze in 2000 collecting his previous limited edition multi-disc box sets Silver Edition (1993, 10 discs), Historic Edition (1995, 10 discs), and Jubilee Edition (1997, 25 discs), which contain unreleased archival recordings in addition to new studio material. A further five discs were added for this release. Several discs were altered and restructured from their original versions: discs 7 and 8 were extended by five minutes; discs 11, 13, 14, and 22 were slightly remastered; and discs 41 and 42 were restructured. Two tracks from Jubilee Edition were omitted ("The Unspoken Thing" from Disc 19 and "Ludwigs Traum" from Disc 21). The discs are divided into five boxes of ten discs, housed in individual cardboard sleeves. Between 2009 and 2015, tracks from this set were reissued as La Vie Electronique, a series of multi-disc CD sets releasing all the material of The Ultimate Edition in chronological order.

== Track listing ==
All tracks composed by Klaus Schulze.

=== Box 1 ===
Disc 1: Film Musik (Disc 1 of Silver Edition)

No.	Title	Note	Length
1.	"Die Lieder des Prinzen Vogelfrei"	studio (1993), reissued on La Vie Electronique 11	28:26
2.	"Le Médaillon Magique"	studio (1993), reissued on La Vie Electronique 11	15:51
3.	"Schwermütiger Frühling"	studio (1993), reissued on La Vie Electronique 11	19:59
4.	"Der Optimismus"	studio (1993), reissued on La Vie Electronique 11	10:39

Disc 2: Narren des Schicksals (Disc 2 of Silver Edition)

No.	Title	Note	Length
1.	"1. Satz (con moto)"	studio (1992–3), reissued on La Vie Electronique 11	20:22
2.	"2. Satz (grave)"	studio (1992–3), reissued on La Vie Electronique 11	22:55
3.	"3. Satz (ma con brio)"	studio (1992–3), reissued on La Vie Electronique 11	27:37

Disc 3: Was War Vor der Zeit (Disc 3 of Silver Edition)

No.	Title	Note	Length
1.	"Nostalgic Echo"	concert (1976), reissued on La Vie Electronique 5	34:08
2.	"Titanische Tage"	concert (1976), reissued on La Vie Electronique 5	27:12
3.	"Die Lebendige Spur"	concert (1975), reissued on La Vie Electronique 3	12:44

Disc 4: Sense of Beauty (Disc 4 of Silver Edition)

No.	Title	Note	Length
1.	"Der Schönheit Spur"	studio (1993), reissued on La Vie Electronique 11	37:36
2.	"Ein Schönes Autodafé"	studio (1993), reissued on La Vie Electronique 11	21:24
3.	"Return in Happy Plight"	studio (1993), reissued on La Vie Electronique 11	19:08

Disc 5: Picasso Geht Spazieren (Disc 5 of Silver Edition)

No.	Title	Note	Length
1.	"Picasso Geht Spazieren: First Movement"	studio (1992), reissued on La Vie Electronique 12	78:39

Disc 6: Picasso Geht Spazieren (Continued) (Disc 6 of Silver Edition)

No.	Title	Note	Length
1.	"Picasso Geht Spazieren: Second Movement"	studio (1992), reissued on La Vie Electronique 12	15:33
2.	"Picasso Geht Spazieren: Third Movement"	studio (1992), reissued on La Vie Electronique 12	60:12

Disc 7: The Music Box (Disc 7 of Silver Edition)

No.	Title	Note	Length
1.	"The Music Box"	studio (1993), 73:56 on Silver Edition; reissued on La Vie Electronique 12	79:13

Disc 8: Machine de Plaisir (Disc 8 of Silver Edition)

No.	Title	Note	Length
1.	"Machine de Plaisir"	studio (1993), 73:51 on Silver Edition; reissued on La Vie Electronique 13	78:32

Disc 9: Life in Ecstasy (Disc 9 of Silver Edition)

No.	Title	Note	Length
1.	"La Présence d'Ésprit"	concert (1975), reissued on La Vie Electronique 3	17:32
2.	"Arthur Stanley Jefferson"	studio (1993), reissued on La Vie Electronique 13	56:55

Disc 10: Mysterious Tapes (Disc 10 of Silver Edition)

No.	Title	Note	Length
1.	"La Vie Secrète"	concert (1975), reissued on La Vie Electronique 6	62:20
2.	"Landpartie"	studio (1972), reissued on La Vie Electronique 16	10:47

=== Box 2 ===
Disc 11: Zeitgeist (Disc 1 of Historic Edition)

No.	Title	Note	Length
1.	"From and To"	concert (1981), reissued on La Vie Electronique 16	20:40
2.	"Zeit Geist"	concert (1977), reissued on La Vie Electronique 6	50:29

Disc 12: I Sing the Body Electric (Disc 2 of Historic Edition)

No.	Title	Note	Length
1.	"Inside the Harlequin"	concert (1977), reissued on La Vie Electronique 6 (26:16)	12:19
2.	"I Sing the Body Electric"	concert (1976), reissued on La Vie Electronique 4	49:11
3.	"Das Herz von Grönland"	concert (1976), reissued on La Vie Electronique 4	14:18

Disc 13: Alles ist Gut (Disc 3 of Historic Edition)

No.	Title	Note	Length
1.	"Alles ist Gut"	concert (1975), reissued on La Vie Electronique 3	36:40
2.	"Well Roared, Lion!"	concert (1975), reissued on La Vie Electronique 3	9:22
3.	"Der Blaue Glauben"	concert (1975), reissued on La Vie Electronique 3	32:16

Disc 14: The Future (Disc 4 of Historic Edition)

No.	Title	Note	Length
1.	"Electric Love-Affair"	studio (1974), reissued on La Vie Electronique 2	10:47
2.	"Tempus Fugit"	studio (1970), reissued on La Vie Electronique 1	26:21
3.	"The Future"	studio (1978), reissued on La Vie Electronique 7	28:18
4.	"Gewitter"	studio (1978), reissued on La Vie Electronique 3	9:22

Disc 15: Leiden mit Manu (Disc 5 of Historic Edition)

No.	Title	Note	Length
1.	"And Now For Something Completely Different"	concert (1981), reissued on La Vie Electronique 16	0:37
2.	"Leiden mit Manu"	concert (1981), reissued on La Vie Electronique 16	38:28
3.	"Zeichen Meines Lebens"	concert (1975), reissued on La Vie Electronique 3	32:08

Disc 16: The Andromeda Strain (Disc 6 of Historic Edition)

No.	Title	Note	Length
1.	"Andromeda Strain"	concert (1976), reissued on La Vie Electronique 4	41:44
2.	"Make Room, Make Room"	concert (1976), reissued on La Vie Electronique 4	28:55

Disc 17: My Virtual Principles (Disc 7 of Historic Edition)

No.	Title	Note	Length
1.	"Dynamo"	studio (1973), reissued on La Vie Electronique 1	14:19
2.	"My Virtual Principles"	studio (1982), reissued on La Vie Electronique 7	62:49

Disc 18: The Poet (Disc 8 of Historic Edition)

No.	Title	Note	Length
1.	"The Poet"	concert (1976), reissued on La Vie Electronique 5	52:49
2.	"Fourneau Cosmique"	concert (1975), reissued on La Vie Electronique 3	25:35

Disc 19: Schwanensee (Disc 9 of Historic Edition)

No.	Title	Note	Length
1.	"Schwanensee II"	studio (1976), reissued on La Vie Electronique 6	21:01
2.	"Havlandet"	studio (1985), reissued on La Vie Electronique 10	27:22
3.	"Schwanensee I"	studio (1976), reissued on La Vie Electronique 6	26:48

Disc 20: Der Lauf der Dinge (Disc 10 of Historic Edition)

No.	Title	Note	Length
1.	"Traumraum"	studio (1973), reissued on La Vie Electronique 1	31:32
2.	"The Real McCoy"	studio (1970), reissued on La Vie Electronique 1	12:50
3.	"Der Lauf der Dinge"	studio (1975), reissued on La Vie Electronique 3	20:45
4.	"Memento Mori"	studio (1974), reissued on La Vie Electronique 2	9:08

=== Box 3 ===
Disc 21: Tradition & Vision (Disc 1 of Jubilee Edition)

No.	Title	Note	Length
1.	"Tradition and Vision"	studio (1997), reissued on La Vie Electronique 14	78:45

Disc 22: Avec Arthur (Disc 2 of Jubilee Edition)

No.	Title	Note	Length
1.	"Re: People I Know"	concert (1977), reissued on La Vie Electronique 7	40:19
2.	"Avec Arthur"	concert (1979), reissued on La Vie Electronique 7	37:29

Disc 23: Budapest (Disc 3 of Jubilee Edition)

No.	Title	Note	Length
1.	"Ludwig Revisited"	concert (1982), reissued on La Vie Electronique 9	21:27
2.	"Peg Leg Dance"	concert (1982), reissued on La Vie Electronique 9	39:18
3.	"Die spirituelle Kraft des Augenblicks"	concert (1982), reissued on La Vie Electronique 9	15:30

Disc 24: Borrowed Time (Disc 4 of Jubilee Edition)

No.	Title	Note	Length
1.	"Borrowed Time"	studio (1993), reissued on La Vie Electronique 13	77:12

Disc 25: Opera Trance (Disc 5 of Jubilee Edition)

No.	Title	Note	Length
1.	"Opera Trance"	studio (1993), reissued on La Vie Electronique 14	79:17

Disc 26: Real Colours (Disc 6 of Jubilee Edition)

No.	Title	Note	Length
1.	"The Real Colours in the Darkness"	studio (1985), reissued on Inter*Face	11:59
2.	"Hitchcock Suite"	studio (1977), reissued on La Vie Electronique 8	40:05
3.	"Semper idem"	studio (1975), reissued on La Vie Electronique 3	11:35
4.	"Wann soll man springen?"	studio (1975), reissued on La Vie Electronique 3	15:05

Disc 27: Cyborgs Faust (Disc 7 of Jubilee Edition)

No.	Title	Note	Length
1.	"Cyborgs Traum"	studio (1972), reissued on La Vie Electronique 1	39:11
2.	"Ballet pour le Docteur Faustus"	studio (1978)	38:17

Disc 28: Vie de Rêve (Disc 8 of Jubilee Edition)

No.	Title	Note	Length
1.	"Vie de rêve"	concert (1976), reissued on La Vie Electronique 5	48:52
2.	"L'affaire Tournesol"	concert (1979), reissued on La Vie Electronique 8	19:34
3.	"There was Greatness in the Room (Fragment)"	concert (1979), reissued on La Vie Electronique 6	8:29

Disc 29: Der Welt Lauf (Disc 9 of Jubilee Edition)

No.	Title	Note	Length
1.	"Goodwill"	studio (1991), reissued on La Vie Electronique 10	13:01
2.	"Whales"	studio (1991), reissued on La Vie Electronique 16	19:49
3.	"Experimentelle Bagatelle"	studio (1970s), reissued on La Vie Electronique 3	4:06
4.	"Der Welt Lauf"	concert (1981), reissued on La Vie Electronique 16	41:50

Disc 30: Die Kunst... (Disc 10 of Jubilee Edition)

No.	Title	Note	Length
1.	"Tag des offenen Denkmals"	studio (1993), reissued on La Vie Electronique 13	0:29
2.	"Les jockeys camouflés"	studio (1972), reissued on La Vie Electronique 1	7:59
3.	"Die Kunst, hundert Jahre alt zu werden"	studio (1971), reissued on La Vie Electronique 1	64:05
4.	"Interview with KS in 1982"		6:00

=== Box 4 ===
Disc 31: Olé! (Disc 11 of Jubilee Edition)

No.	Title	Note	Length
1.	"Olé!"	concert (1991), reissued on La Vie Electronique 10	16:27
2.	"Habla Español?"	concert (1991), reissued on La Vie Electronique 10	17:23
3.	"Gaudi Gaudi"	concert (1991), reissued on La Vie Electronique 10	23:07
4.	"Keep Up With the Times"	studio (1981), reissued on La Vie Electronique 8	16:08
5.	"Fear at Madame Tussaud's"	concert (1977), reissued on La Vie Electronique 6	6:19

Disc 32: Titanensee (Disc 12 of Jubilee Edition)

No.	Title	Note	Length
1.	"Titanensee"	studio (1973), reissued on La Vie Electronique 2	27:05
2.	"Land der leeren Häuser"	studio (1973), reissued on La Vie Electronique 2	11:11
3.	"Studies for Organ, Keyboard and Drumset"	studio (1974), reissued on La Vie Electronique 2	14:47
4.	"North of the Yukon"	studio (1972), reissued on La Vie Electronique 2	20:39
5.	"I Remember Rahsaan"	studio (1981), reissued on La Vie Electronique 8	5:20

Disc 33: Angry Moog (Disc 13 of Jubilee Edition)

No.	Title	Note	Length
1.	"Angry Young Moog"	studio (1994), reissued on La Vie Electronique 14	8:01
2.	"Kosmisches Gleiteisen"	studio (1994), reissued on La Vie Electronique 14	3:41
3.	"Operatic March"	studio (1994), reissued on La Vie Electronique 14	3:40
4.	"Kosmisches Gleiteisen, pt. 2"	studio (1994), reissued on La Vie Electronique 14	1:54
5.	"Angry Young Moog, pt. 2"	studio (1994), reissued on La Vie Electronique 14	13:11
6.	"Das große Identifikationsspiel"	studio (1973), reissued on La Vie Electronique 2	41:55
7.	"Kurzes Stück im alten Stil"	studio (1970s), reissued on La Vie Electronique 3	7:00

Disc 34: Die Erde ist Rund (Disc 14 of Jubilee Edition)

No.	Title	Note	Length
1.	"The Oberhausen Tape"	studio (1976), reissued on La Vie Electronique 5	22:58
2.	"The Other Oberhausen Tape"	studio (1976), reissued on La Vie Electronique 6	22:00
3.	"Die Erde ist rund"	concert (1979), reissued on La Vie Electronique 7	11:52
4.	"Shadow Piece"	concert (1975), reissued on La Vie Electronique 4	13:08
5.	"German Interview with KS in 1984"	reissued on La Vie Electronique 9	7:11

Disc 35: Deutsch (Disc 15 of Jubilee Edition)

No.	Title	Note	Length
1.	"Unheilbar Deutsch"	concert (1985), reissued on La Vie Electronique 10	53:49
2.	"Just Skins"	studio (1970), reissued on La Vie Electronique 16	24:37

Disc 36: Unplugged (Disc 16 of Jubilee Edition)

No.	Title	Note	Length
1.	"Nightwind"	studio (1973), reissued on La Vie Electronique 2	16:12
2.	"Minuet"	studio (1973), reissued on La Vie Electronique 2	11:36
3.	"Signs of Dawn"	studio (1973), reissued on La Vie Electronique 2	22:35
4.	"Phonetisches Plakat"	studio (1979), reissued on La Vie Electronique 8	7:21
5.	"Study for Brian Eno"	studio (1970), reissued on La Vie Electronique 1	7:17
6.	"Study for Philip K. Dick"	studio (1972), reissued on La Vie Electronique 2	8:28
7.	"German Interview with KS in 1979"	reissued on La Vie Electronique 7	2:27

Disc 37: Mostly Bruxelles (Disc 17 of Jubilee Edition)

No.	Title	Note	Length
1.	"Dans un jardin"	concert (1979), reissued on La Vie Electronique 8	39:58
2.	"Faster Than Lightning"	concert (1979), reissued on La Vie Electronique 8	29:50
3.	"Study for Terry Riley"	studio (1971), reissued on La Vie Electronique 1	5:07

Disc 38: À la Mode? (Disc 18 of Jubilee Edition)

No.	Title	Note	Length
1.	"Verblüffe sie!"	studio (1980s), reissued on La Vie Electronique 9	34:18
2.	"Seltsam Statisch"	studio (1983), reissued on La Vie Electronique 9	21:28
3.	"Kompromisslose Invention"	studio (1980s), reissued on La Vie Electronique 9	15:44
4.	"Maxxi"	studio (1985), reissued as "Nichtarische Arie" on Inter*Face (13:47) and on La Vie Electronique 10	7:43

Disc 39: Interessant (Disc 20 of Jubilee Edition)

No.	Title	Note	Length
1.	"National Radio Waves"	studio (1980s), reissued on La Vie Electronique 9	53:00
2.	"The Midas Touch"	studio (1980s), reissued on La Vie Electronique 9	20:06
3.	"German Interview with KS in 1984"	reissued on La Vie Electronique 9	3:59

Disc 40: Stahlsinfonie (Disc 24 of Jubilee Edition)

No.	Title	Note	Length
1.	"Linzer Stahlsinfonie"	concert (1980), reissued as DVD with Dig It	59:58
2.	"Bona Fide"	concert (1979), reissued on La Vie Electronique 8	14:29

=== Box 5 ===
Disc 41: Walk the Edge

No.	Title	Note	Length
1.	"Walk the Edge"	studio (1985), on Jubilee Edition (CD 21), reissued on La Vie Electronique 10	46:25
2.	"Darkest Steglitz"	concert (1976), reissued on La Vie Electronique 4	7:39
3.	"Berlin Schöneberg"	concert (1976), reissued on La Vie Electronique 5	24:14

Disc 42: New Style

No.	Title	Note	Length
1.	"Ein ruhiger Nachmittag"	studio (1980s), on Jubilee Edition (CD 19), reissued on La Vie Electronique 16	31:20
2.	"Get the Car, Harry"	studio (1978), reissued on La Vie Electronique 16	19:05
3.	"For Barry Graves"	concert (1977), reissued on La Vie Electronique 5 (15:38)	14:29
4.	"Suite Nr. 3, D-Dur, 2. Satz "Air" (Bach)"	studio (1992), on Jubilee Edition (CD 19), reissued on La Vie Electronique 10	8:01

Disc 43: Höchstamtliche Sounds (Disc 22 of Jubilee Edition)

No.	Title	Note	Length
1.	"The Martial Law"	concert (1983), reissued on La Vie Electronique 8	31:16
2.	"Blaue Stunde"	studio (1975), reissued on La Vie Electronique 2	37:48
3.	"A Quick One"	studio (1981), reissued on La Vie Electronique 8	3:49
4.	"Count Me In"	studio (1981), reissued on La Vie Electronique 8	4:01

Disc 44: Planetarium London (Disc 23 of Jubilee Edition)

No.	Title	Note	Length
1.	"Der Ursprung der Welt"	concert (1977), reissued on La Vie Electronique 16	26:24
2.	"Midnight at Madame Tussaud's"	concert (1977), reissued on La Vie Electronique 16	16:17
3.	"Totally Wired"	concert (1977), reissued on La Vie Electronique 16	34:00

Disc 45: 'Nuff Said! (Disc 25 of Jubilee Edition)

No.	Title	Note	Length
1.	"'Nuff Said!"	studio (1997), reissued on La Vie Electronique 15	79:06

Disc 46: Bologna

No.	Title	Note	Length
1.	"L'opera aperta"	concert (1998), reissued on La Vie Electronique 15	49:43
2.	"La tolleranza"	concert (1998), reissued on La Vie Electronique 15	15:23
3.	"Time Goes By"	studio (1999), reissued on La Vie Electronique 15	12:26

Disc 47: Discoveries

No.	Title	Note	Length
1.	"Discover Trakl"	studio (1978)	27:55
2.	"Crazy Nietzsche"	studio (1978), reissued on La Vie Electronique 7	43:12

Disc 48: From the Attic

No.	Title	Note	Length
1.	"Just an Old-Fashioned Schulze Track"	concert (1975), reissued on La Vie Electronique 4	73:20
2.	"Zooblast"	studio (1993), reissued on La Vie Electronique 14	3:11

Disc 49: The Cello

No.	Title	Note	Length
1.	"Cum cello spiritu"	studio (1999), reissued on La Vie Electronique 15	26:40
2.	"Cellingua"	studio (1999), reissued on La Vie Electronique 15	27:40
3.	"Cello cum laude"	studio (1999), reissued on La Vie Electronique 15	24:18

Disc 50: Lone Tracks

No.	Title	Note	Length
1.	"Berlin Zehlendorf"	concert (1976), reissued on La Vie Electronique 16	21:24
2.	"Unikat"	studio (1989), reissued on La Vie Electronique 16	11:25
3.	"The Face of Mae West"	studio (1990), reissued on La Vie Electronique 16	8:14
4.	"Himmel und Erde (Remix)"	studio (1993), reissued on La Vie Electronique 13	7:04
5.	"Vas Insigne Electionis"	studio (1993), reissued on La Vie Electronique 13	9:44
6.	"Große Gaukler Gottes"	studio (1994), reissued on La Vie Electronique 14	5:20
7.	"Dreieinhalb Stunden"	studio (1996), reissued on La Vie Electronique 14	4:25
8.	"The Schulzendorf Groove (First Version)"	studio (1998), reissued on La Vie Electronique 14	11:32

== Trailer ==
Trailer

Compilation album by Klaus Schulze
- Released: 1999
- Genres: Electronic music, space music
- Label: Série Poème
- Producer: Klaus Schulze

Prior to the release of The Ultimate Edition a compilation album was made available in 1999, containing excerpts from the set, as well as three exclusive tracks, one of which ("In Cosa Crede Chi Non Crede?"), while appearing here as an excerpt, was later reissued complete on Mirage in 2005, and another ("Man at Work"), was later reissued on La Vie Electronique 14 in 2014.

No.	Title	Note	Length
1.	"La Tolleranza (Excerpt)"	from CD 46 of The Ultimate Edition	7:32
2.	"In Praise of Idleness"	previously unreleased	4:15
3.	"Crazy Nietzsche (Excerpt)"	from CD 47 of The Ultimate Edition	11:08
4.	"Darkest Steglitz"	from CD 41 of The Ultimate Edition	7:22
5.	"In Cosa Crede Chi Non Crede? (Excerpt)"	previously unreleased; complete version reissued on Mirage	5:20
6.	"Discover Trakl (Excerpt)"	from CD 47 of The Ultimate Edition	7:20
7.	"Just An Old-Fashoined Schulze Track (Excerpt)"	from CD 48 of The Ultimate Edition	10:20
8.	"Der Optimismus (Excerpt)"	from CD 1 of The Ultimate Edition	6:24
9.	"Man at Work"	previously unreleased; reissued on La Vie Electronique 14	2:29

== See also ==
- Contemporary Works I
- Contemporary Works II
