= Angst (soundtrack) =

Soundtrack album by Klaus Schulze
- Released: March 1984
- Recorded: April & September, October 1983
- Genres: Electronic music, space music
- Length: 41:06 (original); 72:06 (reissue)
- Label: Inteam
- Producer: Klaus Schulze

Klaus Schulze chronology
Dziekuje Poland Live '83 (1983)	Angst (1984)	Inter*Face (1985)

Professional ratings
Review scores
Source	Rating
Allmusic	2.5/5 stars

Angst is the seventeenth album by Klaus Schulze. It was originally released in 1984, and in 2005 was the fourteenth Schulze album reissued by Revisited Records. It is the soundtrack for the 1983 Austrian film of the same name. "Freeze" featured in the 1986 film Manhunter.

== Track listing ==
All tracks are written by Klaus Schulze.

Side one
No.	Title	Length
1.	"Freeze"	6:36
2.	"Pain"	9:36
3.	"Memory"	4:50

Side two
No.	Title	Length
1.	"Surrender"	8:41
2.	"Beyond"	10:16

2005 Revisited Records bonus track
No.	Title	Length
6.	"Silent Survivor"	31:40
