= En=Trance =

Studio album by Klaus Schulze
- Released: 7 April 1988
- Recorded: 1987
- Genre: Electronic, space music, prototrance
- Length: 70:34 (original); 78:49 (reissue)
- Label: Brain
- Producer: Klaus Schulze

Klaus Schulze chronology
Dreams (1986)	En=Trance (1988)	Miditerranean Pads (1990)

Professional ratings
Review scores
Source	Rating
Allmusic	4/5 stars

En=Trance is the twentieth studio album by electronic artist Klaus Schulze. It was originally released in 1988, and in 2005 was his seventh album reissued by Revisited Records. In 2017 it was reissued again in a newly remastered version.

== Track listing ==
All tracks composed by Klaus Schulze.

Side one
No.	Title	Length
1.	"En=Trance"	18:53

Side two
No.	Title	Length
1.	"α-Numerique"	16:28

Side three
No.	Title	Length
1.	"FM Delight"	17:28

Side four
No.	Title	Length
1.	"Velvet System"	17:49

2005 Revisited Records bonus track
No.	Title	Note	Length
5.	"Elvish Sequencer"	Recorded 1975	8:02
