= Dreams (Klaus Schulze album) =

Studio album by Klaus Schulze
- Released: 1 November 1986
- Recorded: 1986
- Genre: New-age, electronic, space
- Length: 55:58 (original); 79:50 (reissue)
- Label: Brain
- Producer: Klaus Schulze

Klaus Schulze chronology
Inter*Face (1985)	Dreams (1986)	En=Trance (1988)

Professional ratings
Review scores
Source	Rating
Allmusic	3/5 stars

Dreams is the nineteenth album by Klaus Schulze. It was released in 1986, and in 2005 was the third Schulze album reissued by Revisited Records. The reissue bonus track was released early 2004 in Hambühren as a limited promo CD Ion.

== Track listing ==
All tracks are written by Klaus Schulze.

Side one
No.	Title	Length
1.	"A Classical Move"	9:40
2.	"Five to Four"	7:57
3.	"Dreams"	9:25
4.	"Flexible"	4:16

Side two
No.	Title	Length
5.	"Klaustrophony"	24:40

2005 Revisited Records bonus track
No.	Title	Note	Length
6.	"Constellation Andromeda"	recorded 2003; complete version was released on Eternal (2017)	23:52

== Personnel ==
- Klaus Schulze – synthesizer, guitar, keyboards, vocals, engineer, digital mastering, mixing, electronics
- Harald Asmussen – bass
- Andreas Grosser – synthesizer, piano
- Nunu Isa – guitar
- Ulli Schober – percussion
- Ian Wilkinson – vocals
