= Dig It (Klaus Schulze album) =

Studio album by Klaus Schulze
- Released: 31 October 1980
- Recorded: May to September 1980
- Genre: Electronic music, space music, Berlin School
- Length: 48:31 (original); 77:11 (reissue)
- Label: Brain
- Producer: Klaus Schulze

Klaus Schulze chronology
...Live.... (1980)	Dig It (1980)	Trancefer (1981)

Professional ratings
Review scores
Source	Rating
Allmusic	3/5 stars

Dig It is the thirteenth album by Klaus Schulze. It was originally released in 1980, and in 2005 was the sixth Schulze album reissued by Revisited Records. It is Schulze's first fully digital recording. The 2005 reissue includes a bonus DVD with the video recording of the 1980 performance at Ars Electronica, which was previously released as audio on The Ultimate Edition (2000).

The opening track, "Death of an Analogue", would later find use as the main theme to the 1982 Australian horror film Next of Kin, starring Jacki Kerin and John Jarratt.

== Track listing ==
All tracks composed by Klaus Schulze.

Side one
No.	Title	Length
1.	"Death of an Analogue"	12:15
2.	"Weird Caravan"	5:16
3.	"The Looper isn't a Hooker"	8:30

Side two
No.	Title	Length
1.	"Synthasy"	22:53

Deluxe edition bonus track
No.	Title	Length
5.	"Esoteric Goody"	28:21

Deluxe edition bonus DVD
No.	Title	Note	Length
1.	"Linzer Stahlsinfonie"	Opening concert at Ars Electronica, September 8, 1980	62:22

== Personnel ==
- Klaus Schulze – synthesizer, guitar, drums, keyboards, vocals, engineer, computers
- Fred Severloh – drums
