= X (Klaus Schulze album) =

Studio album by Klaus Schulze
- Released: September 1978
- Recorded: 1978; Panne-Paulsen Studios, Frankfurt, Germany
- Genre: Electronic music, space music, Kosmische Musik
- Length: 116:41 (original); 159:28 (reissue)
- Label: Brain Records
- Producer: Klaus Schulze

Klaus Schulze chronology
| Body Love; Vol. 2 (1977) | X (1978) | Dune (1979) |

Professional ratings
Review scores
| Source | Rating |
|---|---|
| Allmusic | 4/5 stars |

X is the tenth album by Klaus Schulze. It was originally released in 1978, and in 2005 was the fifth Schulze album reissued by Revisited Records.

== Composition ==
On X Schulze attempted to execute a concept album of six "musical biographies" evoking contemporary or historical intellectuals with an influence on Schulze: Friedrich Nietzsche, Georg Trakl, Frank Herbert, Friedemann Bach, Ludwig II. von Bayern, and Heinrich von Kleist. (In Ludwig II. von Bayern Schulze uses a theme inspired by the third movement of Vivaldi's Concerto No. 11 in D minor (RV565) for 2 violins, cello and strings.) The work is from the classic era of Berlin School.

For two of the tracks, "Friedemann Bach" and "Ludwig II. von Bayern" (as well as the first few minutes of "Heinrich von Kleist") Schulze recorded a modest string orchestra and looped them on tape. He had done this in 1972 on his first solo album, Irrlicht, but this time he did not filter the orchestra beyond recognition. On following releases Schulze employed a cello, particularly on Dune. "Objet d'Louis", the bonus track on the 2005 reissue, is a 1978 live version of "Ludwig II. von Bayern" with a complete orchestra, recorded while Schulze was on a tour in Belgium.

Schulze later reworked and in 2000 reissued the original versions of "Friedrich Nietzsche" and "Georg Trakl" as "Crazy Nietzsche" and "Discover Trakl" on the compilation CD "The Ultimate Edition" disc 47 titled "Discoveries".

== Track listing ==
All tracks composed by Klaus Schulze.

Side one
| No. | Title | Note | Length |
|---|---|---|---|
| 1. | "Friedrich Nietzsche" | | 24:50 |
| 2. | "Georg Trakl" | 26:04 on deluxe edition | 5:25 |

Side two
| No. | Title | Length |
|---|---|---|
| 1. | "Frank Herbert" | 10:51 |
| 2. | "Friedemann Bach" | 18:00 |

Side three
| No. | Title | Length |
|---|---|---|
| 1. | "Ludwig II. von Bayern" | 28:39 |

Side four
| No. | Title | Length |
|---|---|---|
| 1. | "Heinrich von Kleist" | 29:32 |

Deluxe edition bonus track
| No. | Title | Note | Length |
|---|---|---|---|
| 7. | "Objet d'Louis" | Live version of "Ludwig II. von Bayern" | 21:32 |

== Personnel ==
- Klaus Schulze – electronics, percussion (on "Friedemann Bach" and "Heinrich von Kleist")
- Harald Grosskopf – drum kit ("Friedrich Nietzsche", "Georg Trakl", "Frank Herbert", "Friedemann Bach")
- Wolfgang Tiepold – cello (on "Friedemann Bach", "Heinrich von Kleist"), conductor (on "Ludwig II. von Bayern" and "Objet d'Louis")
- B. Dragić – solo violin (on "Friedemann Bach")
- Small string orchestra from Orchester des Hessischen Rundfunks [8 violins, 3 violas, 3 cellos, 1 double bass] (on "Friedemann Bach", "Ludwig II. von Bayern")
- Large string orchestra of young Belgian musicians (on "Objet d'Louis")
