= Klaus Schulze =

German composer and musician (1947–2022)

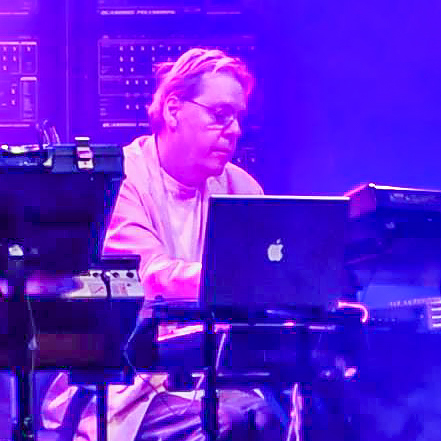
- Schulze in 2009

Background information
- Born: 4 August 1947; Berlin, Allied-occupied Germany
- Died: 26 April 2022 (aged 74)
- Genres: Electronic; ambient; kosmische; krautrock; trance
- Occupations: Musician; producer
- Instruments: Keyboards; synthesiser; sequencer; guitar; bass; drums; percussion; vocals
- Years active: 1969–2022
- Labels: Ohr; Brain; PolyGram; Virgin; Metronome; Manikin; Island; IC; Inteam; ZYX; WEA; Rainhorse; Synthetic Symphony; FAX
- Formerly of: Tangerine Dream; Ash Ra Tempel; the Cosmic Jokers
- Website: klaus-schulze.com

Klaus Schulze (4 August 1947 – 26 April 2022) was a German electronic music pioneer, composer and musician. He also used the alias Richard Wahnfried and was a member of the Krautrock bands Tangerine Dream, Ash Ra Tempel, and the Cosmic Jokers before launching a solo career consisting of more than 60 albums released across six decades.

== Early life ==
Schulze was born in Berlin in 1947. His father was a writer, and his mother a ballet dancer. After graduating from high school, he delivered telegrams and studied German at Technische Universität Berlin. He and his wife Elfie had two sons – Maximilian and Richard.

== Career ==
=== 1970s ===
In 1969, Schulze was the drummer of one of the early incarnations of Tangerine Dream – one of the most famous bands that got the nickname "Krautrock" in English speaking countries (others included Kraftwerk and Popol Vuh) – for their debut album Electronic Meditation. Before 1969 he was a drummer in a band called Psy Free. He met Edgar Froese from Tangerine Dream in the Zodiac Club in what was then West Berlin. In 1970 he left this group to form Ash Ra Tempel with Manuel Göttsching and Hartmut Enke, with whom he was also in the band Eruption. In 1971, he chose again to leave a newly formed group after only one album, this time to mount a solo career. In 1972, Schulze released his debut album Irrlicht with organ and a recording of an orchestra filtered almost beyond recognition. Despite the lack of synthesizers, this proto-ambient work is regarded as a milestone in electronic music. His follow-up album, Cyborg, was similar but added the EMS VCS 3 synthesizer.

Since this point, Schulze's career was the most prolific, such that he could claim more than 40 original albums to his name since Irrlicht. Highlights of these include 1975's Timewind, 1976's Moondawn (his first album to feature the Moog synthesizer), 1979's Dune, and 1995's double-album In Blue (which featured one long track called "Return to the Tempel" with electric guitar contributions from his friend Manuel Göttsching of Ash Ra Tempel). In 1976, he was drafted by Japanese percussionist and composer Stomu Yamashta to join his short-lived "supergroup" Go, also featuring Steve Winwood, Michael Shrieve, and Al Di Meola. They released two studio albums (Go in 1976 and Go Too in 1977) and one live album (Go Live from Paris, 1976).

Throughout the 1970s he followed closely in the footsteps of Tangerine Dream, albeit with far lighter sequencer lines and a more reflective, dreamy sheen, not unlike the ambient music of his contemporary Brian Eno. On occasions he would also compose film scores, including horror and thriller movies such as Barracuda (1977) and Next of Kin (1982). Some of his lighter albums are appreciated by new-age music fans, despite the fact that Schulze has always denied connections to this genre. By mid-decade, with the release of Timewind and Moondawn, his style transformed from Krautrock to Berlin School.

Schulze had a more organic sound than other electronic artists of the time. Often he would throw in decidedly non-electronic sounds, such as acoustic guitar and a male operatic voice in Blackdance, or a cello in Dune (1979) and Trancefer. Schulze developed a Minimoog patch that sounds uncannily like an electric guitar. Schulze often takes German events as a starting point for his compositions, a notable example being on his 1978 album "X" (the title signifying it was his tenth album), subtitled "Six Musical Biographies", a reference to such notables as Ludwig II of Bavaria, Friedrich Nietzsche, Georg Trakl, and Wilhelm Friedemann Bach. His use of the pseudonym Richard Wahnfried is indicative of his interest in Richard Wagner, a clear influence on some albums like the aforementioned Timewind.

Schulze built a record studio in Hambühren, Germany.

=== 1980s ===
In the 1980s Schulze started using digital instruments besides the usual analog synthesizers, and his work accordingly became less experimental and more accessible. Although the switch to using digital equipment is audible in the style of Dig It (1980), it was not until the release of Trancefer (1981) that the shift in style became evident.

This newer style can also be found in Schulze's next release Audentity. Both "Cellistica" and "Spielglocken" are composed in a similar sequencer-based style as on Trancefer, but this is certainly not the case of all of Audentity's tracks; indeed, "Sebastian im Traum" hints towards the operatic style to be found in some of Schulze's much later works. The predominance of sequencing can also be found in the follow-up live album Dziękuję Poland Live '83, although many of its tracks are re-workings of those to be found on Audentity. Schulze's next studio-based album was Angst (soundtrack to the namesake 1983 film). The cold yet haunting electronic rhythms generate an alienated atmosphere. Typical are the Fairlight synth and Linn electronic drums sounds.

Another highlight of this era was En=Trance with the dreamy cut "FM Delight". The album Miditerranean Pads marked the beginning of very complex percussion arrangements that continued through the next two decades.

In 1989, German band Alphaville released their album The Breathtaking Blue, on which Klaus Schulze was both a contributing musician and the album's producer.

=== 1990s ===
Starting with Beyond Recall, the first half of the 1990s was his "sample" period, when Schulze used a wide variety of prerecorded sounds such as screeching birds and sensuous female moans in his studio albums and live performances. Sampling heavily died down with his 1995 album In Blue. The decade also saw the release of copious amounts of previously unreleased material, of varying quality, in several limited-edition boxed sets.

=== 2000s ===
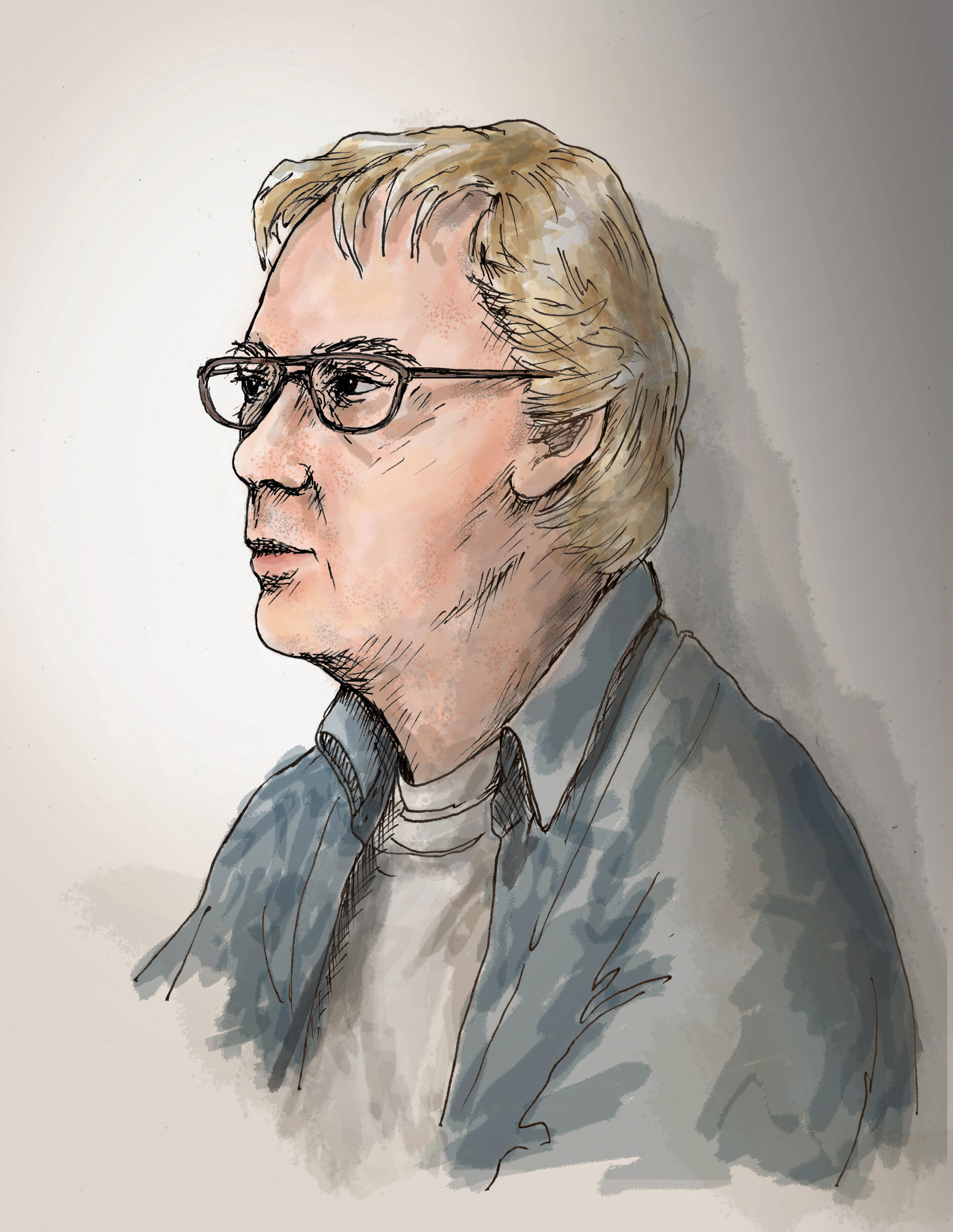
Klaus Schulze, portrait

In 2005 he began re-releasing his classic solo and Wahnfried albums with bonus tracks of unreleased material recorded at roughly the same time as the original works. In the latter part of the decade, Schulze produced albums and staged numerous live appearances with Lisa Gerrard.

=== 2010s ===
Big in Japan: Live in Tokyo 2010 was Schulze's fortieth album, and its release in September 2010 marked the beginning of his fifth decade as a solo musician. The Japan concerts were to be his last live performances.

His next album, Shadowlands, was released in February 2013, quickly to be followed by the release of The Schulze–Schickert Session 1975, a rare long-unreleased collaboration, in March 2013. After a hiatus of several years, he returned to the studio in 2018 for another album, Silhouettes. Much of the album was recorded in a single take.

== Death ==
Schulze died on 26 April 2022 following years of kidney disease and kidney dialysis. His final album, Deus Arrakis, was released on 1 July 2022.

== Richard Wahnfried ==
Richard Wahnfried, then simply Wahnfried after 1993, is the longtime and only real alias for Klaus Schulze – originally a pseudonym, later an official side project name. Seven albums were released under this name between 1979 and 1997.

The main characteristics of the Wahnfried albums (as opposed to Schulze's regular works) are:

- Often being oriented towards more mainstream genres (some would say "more commercial"), such as rock, dance, techno, and trance.
- Always allowing for collaborative and less electronic albums, with known or unknown guest musicians performing along with Schulze's synths.

The pseudonym's etymology stems from Schulze's love for Richard Wagner:

- Richard, evidently from Wagner's first name. Richard is also the name of Schulze's first son.
- Wahnfried ("Peace from delusion and/or madness", in German), from the name Wagner gave to his villa in Bayreuth (and where he was later buried).

In his 1975 album Timewind (four years before the first alias use), Schulze had already named a track "Wahnfried 1883" (in reference to Wagner's death and burial in his Wahnfried's garden in 1883). The other track on Timewind is called "Bayreuth Return". After 1993, the albums are simply credited to "Wahnfried", and namedrop Schulze ("featuring Klaus Schulze", "Produced by Klaus Schulze").

"Wahnfried" is the only known alias of Schulze (although on the 1998 Tribute to Klaus Schulze album, among 10 other artists, Schulze contributed one track barely hidden behind the "Schulzendorfer Groove Orchester" pseudonym).

== Discography ==
=== Albums ===
Schulze's concert performances are original compositions recorded live and thus listed as albums. An intensive reissue program of Schulze CDs began in 2005, with most releases having bonus tracks, and sometimes additional discs. They are published by the label Revisited Records (a division of German company InsideOut Music), and distributed by SPV.

Year	Title	Reissued
1972	Irrlicht	2006
1973	Cyborg	2006
1974	Blackdance	2007
1975	Picture Music	2005
1975	Timewind	2006
1976	Moondawn	2005
1977	Body Love (soundtrack)	2005
1977	Mirage	2005
1977	Body Love Vol. 2	2007
1978	X	2005
1979	Dune	2005
1980	...Live... (live)	2007
1980	Dig It	2005
1981	Trancefer	2006
1983	Audentity	2005
1983	Dziękuję Poland Live '83 (live)	2006
1984	Angst (soundtrack)	2005
1985	Inter*Face	2006
1986	Dreams	2005
1988	En=Trance	2005
1990	Miditerranean Pads	2005
1990	The Dresden Performance (live)	
1991	Beyond Recall	
1992	Royal Festival Hall Vol. 1 (live)	
1992	Royal Festival Hall Vol. 2 (live)	
1993	The Dome Event (live)	
1994	Le Moulin de Daudet (soundtrack)	2005
1994	Goes Classic	
1994	Totentag	
1994	Das Wagner Desaster Live (live)	2005
1995	In Blue	2005
1996	Are You Sequenced? (live)	2006
1997	Dosburg Online (live)	2006
2001	Live @ KlangArt (live)	2008
2005	Moonlake	
2007	Kontinuum	
2008	Farscape (with Lisa Gerrard)	
2008	Rheingold (live, with Lisa Gerrard)	
2009	Dziękuję Bardzo (live, with Lisa Gerrard)	
2010	Big in Japan: Live in Tokyo 2010 (live)	
2013	Shadowlands	
2013–14	Big in Europe (live, with Lisa Gerrard)	
2014	Stars Are Burning (live)	
2017	Eternal: The 70th Birthday Edition	
2018	Silhouettes	
2019	Next of Kin (soundtrack)	
2022	Deus Arrakis	
2024	101, Milky Way	
2025	Bon Voyage (Live Audimax Hamburg 1981)	

=== Singles ===
Year	Title	Reissued
1985	"Macksy"	The Ultimate Edition (CD38); extended version on Inter*Face reissue
1994	"Conquest of Paradise"	Partially reissued on La Vie Electronique 14

=== (Richard) Wahnfried albums ===
Composed by Schulze and performed with guest artists under alias Richard Wahnfried or later just Wahnfried:

Year	Title	Reissued
1979	Time Actor	2011
1981	Tonwelle	2012
1984	Megatone	2021
1986	Miditation	2012
1994	Trancelation	2019
1996	Trance Appeal	2007
1997	Drums 'n' Balls (The Gancha Dub)	2006
2000	Trance 4 Motion	2018

Notes
This album was originally issued as the third disc of Contemporary Works I.

=== Boxed sets ===
Between 1993 and 2002 Klaus Schulze released several limited edition boxed sets, all composed of non-album material.

Year	Title	Discs	Copies
1993	Silver Edition	10	2000
1995	Historic Edition	10	2000
1997	Jubilee Edition	25	1000
2000	The Ultimate Edition	50^{1}	
2000	Contemporary Works I	10	
2002	Contemporary Works II	5^{2}	2002

Notes
^1 Collecting Silver, Historic, and Jubilee sets, with additional 5 discs.
^2 A bonus sixth disc included with the first 333 copies.

==== Reissues from sets ====
Year	Title	From
2005	Vanity of Sounds	Contemporary Works I (2000)
2006	The Crime of Suspense	Contemporary Works I (2000)
2006	Ballett 1	Contemporary Works I (2000)
2006	Ballett 2	Contemporary Works I (2000)
2007	Ballett 3	Contemporary Works I (2000)
2007	Ballett 4	Contemporary Works I (2000)
2008	Virtual Outback	Contemporary Works II (2002)
2009	La Vie Electronique 1	The Ultimate Edition (2000)
2009	La Vie Electronique 2	The Ultimate Edition (2000)
2009	La Vie Electronique 3	The Ultimate Edition (2000)
2009	La Vie Electronique 4	The Ultimate Edition (2000)
2010	La Vie Electronique 5	The Ultimate Edition (2000)
2010	La Vie Electronique 6	The Ultimate Edition (2000)
2010	La Vie Electronique 7	The Ultimate Edition (2000)
2010	La Vie Electronique 8	The Ultimate Edition (2000)
2011	La Vie Electronique 9	The Ultimate Edition (2000)
2011	La Vie Electronique 10	The Ultimate Edition (2000)
2012	La Vie Electronique 11	The Ultimate Edition (2000)
2012	La Vie Electronique 12	The Ultimate Edition (2000)
2013	La Vie Electronique 13	The Ultimate Edition (2000)
2014	La Vie Electronique 14	The Ultimate Edition (2000)
2014	La Vie Electronique 15	The Ultimate Edition (2000)
2015	La Vie Electronique 16	The Ultimate Edition (2000)
2016	Privée	Contemporary Works I (2000)
2016	Another Green Mile	Contemporary Works II (2002)
2017	Androgyn	Contemporary Works II (2002)
2017	Ultimate Docking	Contemporary Works I (2000)
2018	Trance 4 Motion	Contemporary Works I (2000)
2018	Cocooning	Contemporary Works II (2002)
2019	Timbres of Ice	Contemporary Works II (2002)

=== "The Dark Side of the Moog" ===
"The Dark Side of the Moog" is a Klaus Schulze collaboration with Pete Namlook (joined also by Bill Laswell on volumes four to seven). Each title is a distortion of Pink Floyd song and album titles.

Year	Title	Pink Floyd Title
1994	The Dark Side of the Moog: Wish You Were There	"Wish You Were Here"
1994	The Dark Side of the Moog II: A Saucerful of Ambience	"A Saucerful of Secrets"
1995	The Dark Side of the Moog III: Phantom Heart Brother	"Atom Heart Mother"
1996	The Dark Side of the Moog IV: Three Pipers at the Gates of Dawn	The Piper at the Gates of Dawn
1996	The Dark Side of the Moog V: Psychedelic Brunch	"Alan's Psychedelic Breakfast"
1997	The Dark Side of the Moog VI: The Final DAT	"The Final Cut"
1998	The Dark Side of the Moog VII: Obscured by Klaus	"Obscured by Clouds"
1999	The Dark Side of the Moog VIII: Careful With the AKS, Peter	"Careful with That Axe, Eugene"
2002	The Dark Side of the Moog: The Evolution of the Dark Side of the Moog	
2002	The Dark Side of the Moog IX: Set the Controls for the Heart of the Mother	"Set the Controls for the Heart of the Sun" "Atom Heart Mother"
2005	The Dark Side of the Moog X: Astro Know Me Domina	"Astronomy Domine"
2008	The Dark Side of the Moog XI: The Heart of Our Nearest Star	"Set the Controls for the Heart of the Sun"

The Evolution of the Dark Side of the Moog is a compilation album, containing excerpts from the first eight volumes. The series was announced as officially concluded with volume ten when on 21 March 2005 at 14:52 CET, Pete Namlook sold the Big Moog synthesizer that was the symbol of the series. Volume eleven appeared on Namlook's website on 15 April 2008 (and was included in a complete box set).

=== Collaborations ===
Year	Title	Collaborator
1970	Electronic Meditation	Tangerine Dream
1971	Ash Ra Tempel	Ash Ra Tempel
1973	Tarot	Walter Wegmüller
1973	Join Inn	Ash Ra Tempel
1973	Lord Krishna von Goloka	Sergius Golowin
1974	The Cosmic Jokers	The Cosmic Jokers
1974	Planeten Sit-In	The Cosmic Jokers
1974	Galactic Supermarket	The Cosmic Jokers
1974	Sci Fi Party	The Cosmic Jokers
1974	Gilles Zeitschiff	The Cosmic Jokers
1974	Planet of Man	Code III
1976	Go	Go
1976	Go Live from Paris	Go
1977	Go Too	Go
1979	French Skyline	Earthstar
1984	Aphrica	Rainer Bloss and Ernst Fuchs
1984	Drive Inn	Rainer Bloss
1984	Transfer Station Blue	Michael Shrieve and Kevin Shrieve
1987	Babel	Andreas Grosser
2000	Friendship	Ash Ra Tempel
2000	Gin Rosé at the Royal Festival Hall	Ash Ra Tempel
2009	Come Quietly	Lisa Gerrard
2013	The Schulze–Schickert Session	Günter Schickert
2021	Grains of Sand from The Dune Sketchbook	Hans Zimmer

=== Promos ===
- 2003 Andromeda
- 2004 Ion
- 2009 Hommage à Polska (with Lisa Gerrard)

=== Compilations ===
- 1979 Rock On Brain
- 1980 Star Action
- 1988 History (for promotional use, limited to 1,000 copies)
- 1991 2001
- 1994 The Essential 72–93
- 1999 Trailer

== See also ==
- Berlin School of electronic music
- Kosmische Musik
- Urs Amann, illustrator of Schulze's early records
