= Contemporary Works II =

Box set by Klaus Schulze
- Released: 2002
- Recorded: 2001–2002
- Genres: Electronic music, space music
- Label: Rainhorse Records
- Producer: Klaus Schulze

Contemporary Works II is a limited edition 5-disc CD box set released by Klaus Schulze in 2002 containing new studio material. This set was released two years after Contemporary Works I. One of the discs has been reissued in 2008 as part of the overall reissue program of Schulze back catalog by Revisited Records, the remaining four were released by MIG Music between 2016 and 2019. The first 333 copies of this set contained a bonus sixth disc.

== Track listing ==
All tracks composed by Klaus Schulze.

Disc 1: Virtual Outback (reissued in 2008)

| No. | Title | Note | Length |
|---|---|---|---|
| 1. | "The Theme: The Rhodes Elegy" | on original release | 65:00 |
| 2. | "Chinese Ears" | reissue bonus track, shortened version (10:31) originally issued on bonus CD of Contemporary Works II | 14:55 |

Disc 2: Timbres of Ice (reissued in 2019)

| No. | Title | Note | Length |
|---|---|---|---|
| 1. | "The Lonely Dead of Midnight" | on original release | 10:51 |
| 2. | "They Shut Him Out of Paradise" | on original release | 41:41 |
| 3. | "Die Prophezeiung Erfüllt sich" | on original release | 23:15 |

Disc 3: Another Green Mile (reissued in 2016)

| No. | Title | Note | Length |
|---|---|---|---|
| 1. | "Between Twilight and Dawn" | on original release | 13:20 |
| 2. | "In the Streets, in the Rain" | on original release | 4:33 |
| 3. | "The Wisdom of the Leaves" | on original release | 12:27 |
| 4. | "The Story Does Unfold" | on original release | 12:05 |
| 5. | "Follow Me Down, Follow Me Down" | on original release | 28:46 |
| 6. | "Voice'n'Harmony" | reissue bonus track, originally issued on CD 10 of Contemporary Works I | 5:23 |

Disc 4: Androgyn (reissued in 2017)

| No. | Title | Note | Length |
|---|---|---|---|
| 1. | "In the Dimness of Light" | on original release | 12:47 |
| 2. | "Back to the Future" | on original release | 28:02 |
| 3. | "There's No Mystery" | on original release | 4:37 |
| 4. | "Don't Ask the Question Why" | on original release | 5:08 |
| 5. | "The Passion Burns" | on original release | 4:22 |
| 6. | "This House Full of Shadows" | on original release | 20:43 |
| 7. | "A Tiny Violin" | reissue bonus track, originally issued on CD 10 of Contemporary Works I | 4:14 |

Disc 5: Cocooning (reissued in 2018)

| No. | Title | Note | Length |
|---|---|---|---|
| 1. | "Easy Listening" | on original release | 25:28 |
| 2. | "And She Is Kind and Gentle" | on original release | 12:01 |
| 3. | "I Just Have to Sing My Hymns" | on original release | 20:03 |
| 4. | "It Still is Now" | on original release | 2:17 |
| 5. | "Blowin' Thru the High Grass" | on original release | 6:20 |
| 6. | "Many Dreams Have Faded" | on original release | 1:29 |
| 7. | "Many Fears Have Vanished" | on original release | 9:36 |
| 8. | "As the Years Went By" | on original release | 2:07 |

Disc 6: Thank You (included only with the first 333 copies)

| No. | Title | Note | Length |
|---|---|---|---|
| 1. | "Chinese Eyes" | reissued on La Vie Electronique 16 | 13:18 |
| 2. | "Chinese Ears" | full version (14:55) reissued on Virtual Outback | 10:31 |
| 3. | "High Noon (12 Uhr Nachts)" | | 17:33 |
| 4. | "My World Keeps Spinning Around" | | 15:39 |

== Personnel ==
- Klaus Schulze – electronics, keyboards, guitar
- Wolfgang Tiepold – cello
- Thomas Kagermann – Arabian flute, violin, vocals
- Julia Messenger – vocals
- Audrey Motaung – vocals
- Tobias Becker – oboe, English horn
- Mickes – guitar
- Tom Dams – some groove loops

== See also ==
- Silver Edition
- Historic Edition
- Jubilee Edition
- The Ultimate Edition
