= Jubilee Edition =

Box set by Klaus Schulze
- Released: 1997
- Recorded: 1970–1997
- Genres: Electronic music, space music
- Label: Manikin Records
- Producer: Klaus Schulze

Jubilee Edition is a limited edition 25-disc CD box set released by Klaus Schulze in 1997 containing unreleased archival recordings in addition to new studio material. This set was wholly included in Schulze's 50-disc CD box set The Ultimate Edition released in 2000 (disc 2 was slightly remastered and discs 19 and 21 were restructured). Beginning in 2009, tracks from this set were reissued as La Vie Electronique, a series of 3-disc CD sets releasing all the material of The Ultimate Edition in chronological order.

== Track listing ==
All tracks composed by Klaus Schulze.

Disc 1: Tradition & Vision (Disc 21 of The Ultimate Edition)

No.	Title	Note	Length
1.	"Tradition and Vision"	studio (1997), reissued on La Vie Electronique 14	78:45

Disc 2: Avec Arthur (Disc 22 of The Ultimate Edition)

No.	Title	Note	Length
1.	"Re: People I Know"	concert (1977), reissued on La Vie Electronique 7	40:19
2.	"Avec Arthur"	concert (1979), reissued on La Vie Electronique 7	37:29

Disc 3: Budapest (Disc 23 of The Ultimate Edition)

No.	Title	Note	Length
1.	"Ludwig Revisited"	concert (1982), reissued on La Vie Electronique 9	21:27
2.	"Peg Leg Dance"	concert (1982), reissued on La Vie Electronique 9	39:18
3.	"Die spirituelle Kraft des Augenblicks"	concert (1982), reissued on La Vie Electronique 9	15:30

Disc 4: Borrowed Time (Disc 24 of The Ultimate Edition)

No.	Title	Note	Length
1.	"Borrowed Time"	studio (1993), reissued on La Vie Electronique 13	77:12

Disc 5: Opera Trance (Disc 25 of The Ultimate Edition)

No.	Title	Note	Length
1.	"Opera Trance"	studio (1993), reissued on La Vie Electronique 14	79:17

Disc 6: Real Colours (Disc 26 of The Ultimate Edition)

No.	Title	Note	Length
1.	"The Real Colours in the Darkness"	studio (1985), reissued on Inter*Face	11:59
2.	"Hitchcock Suite"	studio (1977), reissued on La Vie Electronique 8	40:05
3.	"Semper idem"	studio (1975), reissued on La Vie Electronique 3	11:35
4.	"Wann soll man springen?"	studio (1975), reissued on La Vie Electronique 3	15:05

Disc 7: Cyborgs Faust (Disc 27 of The Ultimate Edition)

No.	Title	Note	Length
1.	"Cyborgs Traum"	studio (1972), reissued on La Vie Electronique 1	39:11
2.	"Ballet pour le Docteur Faustus"	studio (1978)	38:17

Disc 8: Vie de Rêve (Disc 28 of The Ultimate Edition)

No.	Title	Note	Length
1.	"Vie de rêve"	concert (1976), reissued on La Vie Electronique 5	48:52
2.	"L'affaire Tournesol"	concert (1979), reissued on La Vie Electronique 8	19:34
3.	"There was Greatness in the Room (Fragment)"	concert (1979), reissued on La Vie Electronique 6	8:29

Disc 9: Der Welt Lauf (Disc 29 of The Ultimate Edition)

No.	Title	Note	Length
1.	"Goodwill"	studio (1991), reissued on La Vie Electronique 10	13:01
2.	"Whales"	studio (1991), reissued on La Vie Electronique 16	19:49
3.	"Experimentelle Bagatelle"	studio (1970s), reissued on La Vie Electronique 3	4:06
4.	"Der Welt Lauf"	concert (1981), reissued on La Vie Electronique 16	41:50

Disc 10: Die Kunst (Disc 30 of The Ultimate Edition)

No.	Title	Note	Length
1.	"Tag des offenen Denkmals"	studio (1993), reissued on La Vie Electronique 13	0:29
2.	"Les jockeys camouflés"	studio (1972), reissued on La Vie Electronique 1	7:59
3.	"Die Kunst, hundert Jahre alt zu werden"	studio (1971), reissued on La Vie Electronique 1	64:05
4.	"Interview with KS in 1982"		6:00

Disc 11: Olé! (Disc 31 of The Ultimate Edition)

No.	Title	Note	Length
1.	"Olé!"	concert (1991), reissued on La Vie Electronique 10	16:27
2.	"Habla Español?"	concert (1991), reissued on La Vie Electronique 10	17:23
3.	"Gaudi Gaudi"	concert (1991), reissued on La Vie Electronique 10	23:07
4.	"Keep Up With the Times"	studio (1981), reissued on La Vie Electronique 8	16:08
5.	"Fear at Madame Tussaud's"	concert (1977), reissued on La Vie Electronique 6	6:19

Disc 12: Titanensee (Disc 32 of The Ultimate Edition)

No.	Title	Note	Length
1.	"Titanensee"	studio (1973), reissued on La Vie Electronique 2	27:05
2.	"Land der leeren Häuser"	studio (1973), reissued on La Vie Electronique 2	11:11
3.	"Studies for Organ, Keyboard and Drumset"	studio (1974), reissued on La Vie Electronique 2	14:47
4.	"North of the Yukon"	studio (1972), reissued on La Vie Electronique 2	20:39
5.	"I Remember Rahsaan"	studio (1981), reissued on La Vie Electronique 8	5:20

Disc 13: Angry Moog (Disc 33 of The Ultimate Edition)

No.	Title	Note	Length
1.	"Angry Young Moog"	studio (1994), reissued on La Vie Electronique 14	8:01
2.	"Kosmisches Gleiteisen"	studio (1994), reissued on La Vie Electronique 14	3:41
3.	"Operatic March"	studio (1994), reissued on La Vie Electronique 14	3:40
4.	"Kosmisches Gleiteisen, pt. 2"	studio (1994), reissued on La Vie Electronique 14	1:54
5.	"Angry Young Moog, pt. 2"	studio (1994), reissued on La Vie Electronique 14	13:11
6.	"Das große Identifikationsspiel"	studio (1973), reissued on La Vie Electronique 2	41:55
7.	"Kurzes Stück im alten Stil"	studio (1970s), reissued on La Vie Electronique 3	7:00

Disc 14: Die Erde ist Rund (Disc 34 of The Ultimate Edition)

No.	Title	Note	Length
1.	"The Oberhausen Tape"	studio (1976), reissued on La Vie Electronique 5	22:58
2.	"The Other Oberhausen Tape"	studio (1976), reissued on La Vie Electronique 6	22:00
3.	"Die Erde ist rund"	concert (1979), reissued on La Vie Electronique 7	11:52
4.	"Shadow Piece"	concert (1975), reissued on La Vie Electronique 4	13:08
5.	"German Interview with KS in 1984"	reissued on La Vie Electronique 9	7:11

Disc 15: Deutsch (Disc 35 of The Ultimate Edition)

No.	Title	Note	Length
1.	"Unheilbar Deutsch"	concert (1985), reissued on La Vie Electronique 10	53:49
2.	"Just Skins"	studio (1970), reissued on La Vie Electronique 16	24:37

Disc 16: Unplugged (Disc 36 of The Ultimate Edition)

No.	Title	Note	Length
1.	"Nightwind"	studio (1973), reissued on La Vie Electronique 2	16:12
2.	"Minuet"	studio (1973), reissued on La Vie Electronique 2	11:36
3.	"Signs of Dawn"	studio (1973), reissued on La Vie Electronique 2	22:35
4.	"Phonetisches Plakat"	studio (1979), reissued on La Vie Electronique 8	7:21
5.	"Study for Brian Eno"	studio (1970), reissued on La Vie Electronique 1	7:17
6.	"Study for Philip K. Dick"	studio (1972), reissued on La Vie Electronique 2	8:28
7.	"German Interview with KS in 1979"		2:27

Disc 17: Mostly Bruxelles (Disc 37 of The Ultimate Edition)

No.	Title	Note	Length
1.	"Dans un jardin"	concert (1979), reissued on La Vie Electronique 8	39:58
2.	"Faster Than Lightning"	concert (1979), reissued on La Vie Electronique 8	29:50
3.	"Study for Terry Riley"	studio (1971), reissued on La Vie Electronique 1	5:07

Disc 18: À La Mode? (Disc 38 of The Ultimate Edition)

No.	Title	Note	Length
1.	"Verblüffe sie!"	studio (1980s), reissued on La Vie Electronique 9	34:18
2.	"Seltsam Statisch"	studio (1983), reissued on La Vie Electronique 9	21:28
3.	"Kompromisslose Invention"	studio (1980s), reissued on La Vie Electronique 9	15:44
4.	"Maxxi"	studio (1985), reissued as "Nichtarische Arie" on Inter*Face (13:47) and on La Vie Electronique 10	7:43

Disc 19: New Style

No.	Title	Note	Length
1.	"Ein ruhiger Nachmittag"	studio (1980s), on The Ultimate Edition (CD 42), reissued on La Vie Electronique 16	31:20
2.	"The Unspoken Thing"	studio (1987), omitted from The Ultimate Edition	36:43
3.	"Suite Nr. 3, D-Dur, 2. Satz "Air" (Bach)"	studio (1992), on The Ultimate Edition (CD 42), reissued on La Vie Electronique 10	8:01

Disc 20: Interessant (Disc 39 of The Ultimate Edition)

No.	Title	Note	Length
1.	"National Radio Waves"	studio (1980s), reissued on La Vie Electronique 9	53:00
2.	"The Midas Touch"	studio (1980s), reissued on La Vie Electronique 9	20:06
3.	"German Interview with KS in 1984"	reissued on La Vie Electronique 9	3:59

Disc 21: Walk the Edge

No.	Title	Note	Length
1.	"Walk the Edge"	studio (1985), on The Ultimate Edition (CD 41), reissued on La Vie Electronique 10	46:25
2.	"Ludwigs Traum"	studio (1983), omitted from The Ultimate Edition	29:32

Disc 22: Höchamtliche Sounds (Disc 43 of The Ultimate Edition)

No.	Title	Note	Length
1.	"The Martial Law"	concert (1983), reissued on La Vie Electronique 8	31:16
2.	"Blaue Stunde"	studio (1975), reissued on La Vie Electronique 2	37:48
3.	"A Quick One"	studio (1981), reissued on La Vie Electronique 8	3:49
4.	"Count Me In"	studio (1981), reissued on La Vie Electronique 8	4:01

Disc 23: Planetarium London (Disc 44 of The Ultimate Edition)

No.	Title	Note	Length
1.	"Der Ursprung der Welt"	concert (1977), reissued on La Vie Electronique 16	26:24
2.	"Midnight at Madame Tussaud's"	concert (1977), reissued on La Vie Electronique 16	16:17
3.	"Totally Wired"	concert (1977), reissued on La Vie Electronique 16	34:00

Disc 24: Stahlsinfonie (Disc 40 of The Ultimate Edition)

No.	Title	Note	Length
1.	"Linzer Stahlsinfonie"	concert (1980), reissued as DVD with Dig It	59:58
2.	"Bona Fide"	concert (1979), reissued on La Vie Electronique 8	14:29

Disc 25: 'Nuff Said! (Disc 45 of The Ultimate Edition)

No.	Title	Note	Length
1.	"'Nuff Said!"	studio (1997), reissued on La Vie Electronique 15	79:06

== See also ==
- Silver Edition
- Historic Edition
- Contemporary Works I
- Contemporary Works II
