= Contemporary Works I =

Box set by Klaus Schulze
- Released: 2000
- Recorded: 1998–2000
- Genres: Electronic music, space music
- Label: Rainhorse Records
- Producer: Klaus Schulze

Contemporary Works I is a limited-edition 10-disc CD box set released by Klaus Schulze in 2000 containing new studio material. The CDs are in cardboard sleeves and housed in a wooden box. Two years later Schulze released Contemporary Works II. Six of the discs have been reissued in 2005–2007 as part of the overall reissue program of Schulze back catalog by Revisited Records. Three more have been reissued in 2016–2018 by the label MiG.

== Track listing ==
All tracks composed by Klaus Schulze.

Disc 1: Vanity of Sounds (reissued in 2005)

No.	Title	Note	Length
1.	"Vanity of Sounds"	on original release	17:08
2.	"Sacred Romance"	on original release	23:13
3.	"The Wings of Strings"	on original release	14:47
4.	"From Words to Silence"	on original release	23:40

Disc 2: The Crime of Suspense (reissued in 2006)

No.	Title	Note	Length
1.	"Good Old 4 on the Floor"	on original release	24:00
2.	"J.E.M."	on original release	17:25
3.	"Overchill"	on original release	29:24
4.	"Ruins"	reissue bonus track (from CD 10 of Contemporary Works I)	4:34
5.	"Castles"	reissue bonus track (from CD 10 of Contemporary Works I)	4:15

Disc 3: Wahnfried: Trance 4 Motion (reissued in 2018)

No.	Title	Note	Length
1.	"Local Scanning"	on original release	45:57
2.	"Aphrodesire"	on original release	17:40
3.	"Global Midication (SMS-Remix)"	on original release	15:31

Disc 4: U.S.O.: Privée (reissued in 2016)

No.	Title	Note	Length
1.	"The Keyhole"	on original release	4:02
2.	"Privat"	on original release	19:05
3.	"Privee"	on original release	15:43
4.	"Private"	on original release	25:01
5.	"Privatissimo"	reissue bonus track (from CD 10 of Contemporary Works I)	4:03

Disc 5: Klaus Schulze vs. Solar Moon: Docking (reissued in 2017) {Disc 1}

No.	Title	Note	Length
1.	"Let The Rain Come"	on original release	22:42
2.	"You Get What..."	on original release	22:17
3.	"Strong"	on original release	14:52
4.	"Sugar Mode"	on original release	16:44

Disc 5: Klaus Schulze vs. Solar Moon: Docking (reissued in 2017) {Disc 2}

No.	Title	Note	Length
1.	"Strong (Dub Version)"	reissue bonus track	24:36
2.	"What You Deserve (Poly Dub)"	reissue bonus track	28:55
3.	"What You Deserve (Instrumental)"	reissue bonus track	22:34

Disc 6: Ballett 1 (reissued in 2006)

No.	Title	Note	Length
1.	"Getting Near"	on original release	10:43
2.	"Slightly Touched"	on original release	29:32
3.	"Agony"	on original release	35:30

Disc 7: Ballett 2 (reissued in 2006)

No.	Title	Note	Length
1.	"Atmosphère Concrète"	on original release	7:35
2.	"Kagi's Lament"	on original release	30:12
3.	"Wolf's Ponticelli"	on original release	24:18
4.	"The Smile of Shadows"	on original release	12:06
5.	"Trance 4 Motion"	reissue bonus track (from CD 10 of Contemporary Works I)	5:42

Disc 8: Ballett 3 (reissued in 2007)

No.	Title	Note	Length
1.	"My Ty She"	on original release	75:40
2.	"Schauer der Vorwelt"	reissue bonus track	3:30

Disc 9: Ballett 4 (reissued in 2007)

No.	Title	Note	Length
1.	"Mellowtrone"	on original release	13:53
2.	"Soft'n'Groovy"	on original release	30:00
3.	"To B Flat"	on original release	23:52
4.	"Eleven 2 Eleven"	reissue bonus track (from CD 10 of Contemporary Works I)	10:14

Disc 10: Adds & Edits

No.	Title	Note	Length
1.	"Global Medication"		3:48
2.	"Windy Times"	reissue bonus track on Timewind	4:50
3.	"Short Romance"	reissue bonus track on Live @ KlangArt 1	5:40
4.	"Outer Canal Street"		3:44
5.	"Privatissimo"	reissue bonus track on Privée	4:03
6.	"Deserve"		4:59
7.	"Trance 4 Motion"	reissue bonus track on Ballett 2	5:46
8.	"Strongly"		3:49
9.	"A Tiny Violin"	reissue bonus track on Androgyn	4:14
10.	"Solar Moon"		4:11
11.	"Castles"	reissue bonus track on The Crime of Suspense	4:11
12.	"Short Rain"		3:43
13.	"Ruins"	reissue bonus track on The Crime of Suspense	4:29
14.	"Vox'n'Harmony"	reissue bonus track on Another Green Mile as Voice'n'Harmony	5:23
15.	"Eleven 2 Eleven"	reissue bonus track on Ballett 4	10:05
16.	"The Breeze"		5:31

== See also ==
- Silver Edition
- Historic Edition
- Jubilee Edition
- The Ultimate Edition
