= Historic Edition =

Box set by Klaus Schulze
- Released: 1995
- Recorded: 1970–85
- Genres: Electronic music, space music
- Label: Manikin Records
- Producer: Klaus Schulze

Historic Edition is a limited edition 10-disc CD box set released by Klaus Schulze in 1995 containing unreleased archival recordings. This set was wholly included in Schulze's 50-disc CD box set The Ultimate Edition released in 2000 (discs 1, 3, and 4 were slightly remastered). Beginning in 2009, tracks from this set were reissued as La Vie Electronique, a series of 3-disc CD sets releasing all the material of The Ultimate Edition in chronological order.

== Track listing ==
All tracks composed by Klaus Schulze.

Disc 1: Live 1981 & 1977 (Disc 11 of The Ultimate Edition)

No.	Title	Note	Length
1.	"From and To"	concert (1981), reissued on La Vie Electronique 16	20:40
2.	"Zeit Geist"	concert (1977), reissued on La Vie Electronique 6	50:29

Disc 2: Live 1977 & 1976 (Disc 12 of The Ultimate Edition)

No.	Title	Note	Length
1.	"Inside the Harlequin"	concert (1977), reissued on La Vie Electronique 6 (26:16)	12:19
2.	"I Sing the Body Electric"	concert (1976), reissued on La Vie Electronique 4	49:11
3.	"Das Herz von Grönland"	concert (1976), reissued on La Vie Electronique 4	14:18

Disc 3: Live 1975 (Disc 13 of The Ultimate Edition)

No.	Title	Note	Length
1.	"Alles ist Gut"	concert (1975), reissued on La Vie Electronique 3	36:40
2.	"Well Roared, Lion!"	concert (1975), reissued on La Vie Electronique 3	9:22
3.	"Der Blaue Glauben"	concert (1975), reissued on La Vie Electronique 3	32:16

Disc 4: Studio & Soundtrack 1970-1978 (Disc 14 of The Ultimate Edition)

No.	Title	Note	Length
1.	"Electric Love-Affair"	studio (1974), reissued on La Vie Electronique 2	10:47
2.	"Tempus Fugit"	studio (1970), reissued on La Vie Electronique 1	26:21
3.	"The Future"	studio (1978), reissued on La Vie Electronique 7	28:18
4.	"Gewitter"	studio (1978), reissued on La Vie Electronique 3	9:22

Disc 5: Live 1981 & 1975 (Disc 15 of The Ultimate Edition)

No.	Title	Note	Length
1.	"And Now For Something Completely Different"	concert (1981), reissued on La Vie Electronique 16	0:37
2.	"Leiden mit Manu"	concert (1981), reissued on La Vie Electronique 16	38:28
3.	"Zeichen Meines Lebens"	concert (1975), reissued on La Vie Electronique 3	32:08

Disc 6: Live 1976 (Disc 16 of The Ultimate Edition)

No.	Title	Note	Length
1.	"Andromeda Strain"	concert (1976), reissued on La Vie Electronique 4	41:44
2.	"Make Room, Make Room"	concert (1976), reissued on La Vie Electronique 4	28:55

Disc 7: Studio 1973 & 1982 (Disc 17 of The Ultimate Edition)

No.	Title	Note	Length
1.	"Dynamo"	studio (1973), reissued on La Vie Electronique 1	14:19
2.	"My Virtual Principles"	studio (1982), reissued on La Vie Electronique 7	62:49

Disc 8: Live 1976 & 1975 (Disc 18 of The Ultimate Edition)

No.	Title	Note	Length
1.	"The Poet"	concert (1976), reissued on La Vie Electronique 5	52:49
2.	"Fourneau Cosmique"	concert (1975), reissued on La Vie Electronique 3	25:35

Disc 9: Soundtrack & Studio 1976 & 1985 (Disc 19 of The Ultimate Edition)

No.	Title	Note	Length
1.	"Schwanensee II"	studio (1976), reissued on La Vie Electronique 6	21:01
2.	"Havlandet"	studio (1985), reissued on La Vie Electronique 10	27:22
3.	"Schwanensee I"	studio (1976), reissued on La Vie Electronique 6	26:48

Disc 10: Studio 1970–1975 (Disc 20 of The Ultimate Edition)

No.	Title	Note	Length
1.	"Traumraum"	studio (1973), reissued on La Vie Electronique 1	31:32
2.	"The Real McCoy"	studio (1970), reissued on La Vie Electronique 1	12:50
3.	"Der Lauf der Dinge"	studio (1975), reissued on La Vie Electronique 3	20:45
4.	"Memento Mori"	studio (1974), reissued on La Vie Electronique 2	9:08

== See also ==
- Silver Edition
- Jubilee Edition
- Contemporary Works I
- Contemporary Works II
