= Silver Edition =

Box set by Klaus Schulze
- Released: 1993
- Recorded: 1975–76 & 1992–93
- Genres: Electronic music, space music
- Label: Musique Intemporelle
- Producer: Klaus Schulze

Silver Edition is a limited edition 10-disc CD box set released by Klaus Schulze in 1993 containing new studio material in addition to unreleased archival recordings. This set was wholly included in Schulze's 50-disc CD box set The Ultimate Edition released in 2000. Beginning in 2009, tracks from this set were reissued as La Vie Electronique, a series of 3-disc CD sets releasing all the material of The Ultimate Edition in chronological order.

== Track listing ==
All tracks composed by Klaus Schulze.

Disc 1: Film Musik (Disc 1 of The Ultimate Edition)

No.	Title	Note	Length
1.	"Die Lieder des Prinzen Vogelfrei"	studio (1993), reissued on La Vie Electronique 11	28:26
2.	"Le Médaillon Magique"	studio (1993), reissued on La Vie Electronique 11	15:51
3.	"Schwermütiger Frühling"	studio (1993), reissued on La Vie Electronique 11	19:59
4.	"Der Optimismus"	studio (1993), reissued on La Vie Electronique 11	10:39

Disc 2: Narren des Schicksals (Disc 2 of The Ultimate Edition)

No.	Title	Note	Length
1.	"Satz (con moto)"	studio (1992–3), reissued on La Vie Electronique 11	20:22
2.	"Satz (grave)"	studio (1992–3), reissued on La Vie Electronique 11	22:55
3.	"Satz (ma con brio)"	studio (1992–3), reissued on La Vie Electronique 11	27:37

Disc 3: Was War Vor der Zeit (Disc 3 of The Ultimate Edition)

No.	Title	Note	Length
1.	"Nostalgic Echo"	concert (1976), reissued on La Vie Electronique 5	34:08
2.	"Titanische Tage"	concert (1976), reissued on La Vie Electronique 5	27:12
3.	"Die Lebendige Spur"	concert (1975), reissued on La Vie Electronique 3	12:44

Disc 4: Sense of Beauty (Disc 4 of The Ultimate Edition)

No.	Title	Note	Length
1.	"Der Schönheit Spur"	studio (1993), reissued on La Vie Electronique 11	37:36
2.	"Ein Schönes Autodafé"	studio (1993), reissued on La Vie Electronique 11	21:24
3.	"Return in Happy Plight"	studio (1993), reissued on La Vie Electronique 11	19:08

Disc 5: Picasso Geht Spazieren (Disc 5 of The Ultimate Edition)

No.	Title	Note	Length
1.	"Picasso Geht Spazieren: First Movement"	studio (1992), reissued on La Vie Electronique 12	78:39

Disc 6: Picasso Geht Spazieren (Continued) (Disc 6 of The Ultimate Edition)

No.	Title	Note	Length
1.	"Picasso Geht Spazieren: Second Movement"	studio (1992), reissued on La Vie Electronique 12	15:33
2.	"Picasso Geht Spazieren: Third Movement"	studio (1992), reissued on La Vie Electronique 12	60:12

Disc 7: The Music Box (Disc 7 of The Ultimate Edition)

No.	Title	Note	Length
1.	"The Music Box"	studio (1993), 79:13 on The Ultimate Edition; reissued on La Vie Electronique 12	73:56

Disc 8: Machine de Plaisir (Disc 8 of The Ultimate Edition)

No.	Title	Note	Length
1.	"Machine de Plaisir"	studio (1993), 78:32 on The Ultimate Edition; reissued on La Vie Electronique 13	73:51

Disc 9: Life in Ecstasy (Disc 9 of The Ultimate Edition)

No.	Title	Note	Length
1.	"La Présence d'Ésprit"	concert (1975), reissued on La Vie Electronique 3	17:32
2.	"Arthur Stanley Jefferson"	studio (1993), reissued on La Vie Electronique 13	56:55

Disc 10: Mysterious Tapes (Disc 10 of The Ultimate Edition)

No.	Title	Note	Length
1.	"La Vie Secrète"	concert (1975), reissued on La Vie Electronique 6	62:20
2.	"Landpartie"	studio (1972), reissued on La Vie Electronique 16	10:47

== See also ==
- Historic Edition
- Jubilee Edition
- Contemporary Works I
- Contemporary Works II
