= Space music =

Tranquil, hypnotic subgenre of electronic music

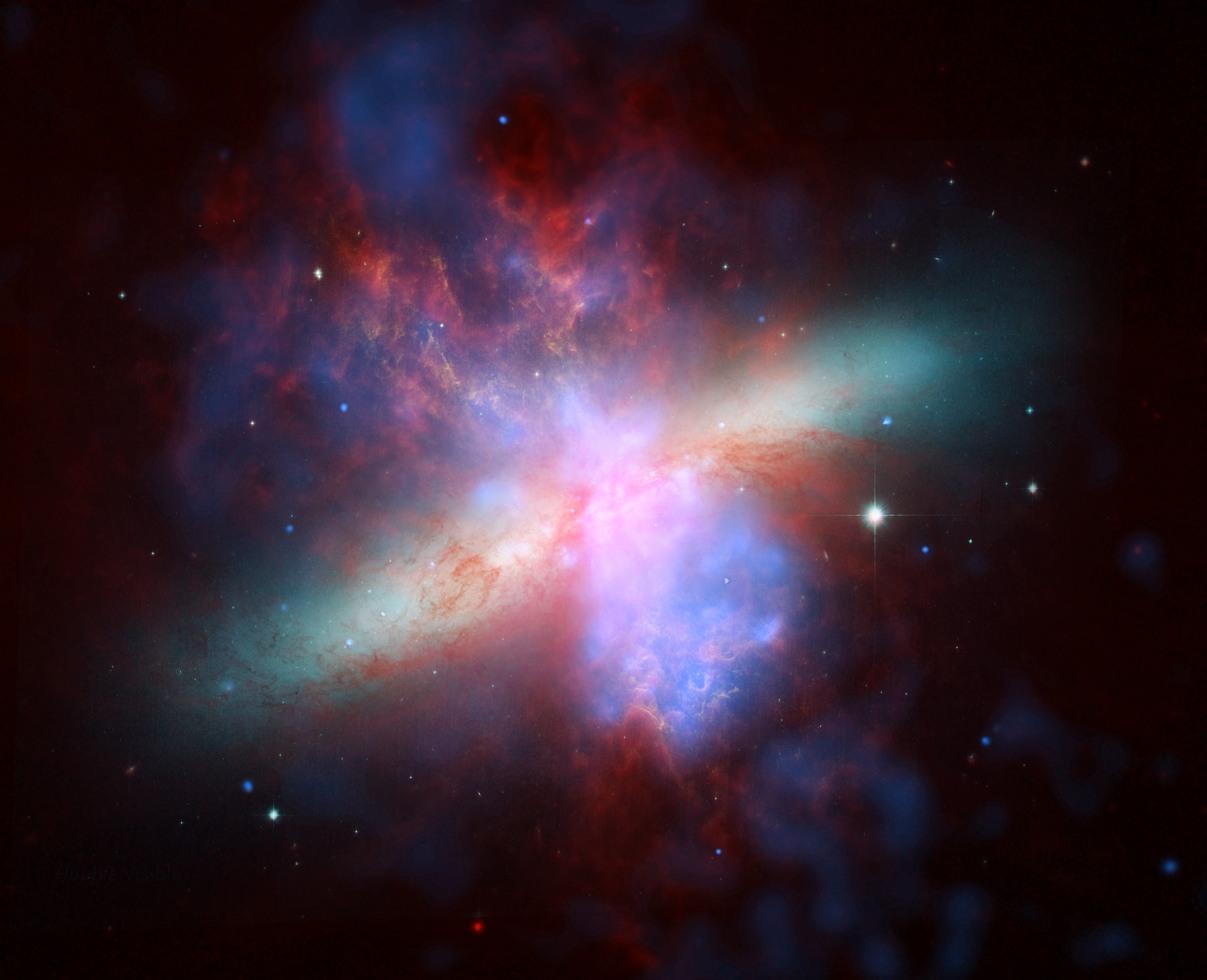
- Space music typically evokes a sense of spatial imagery and emotion or sensations of floating, cruising, flying and other transportative sensations.
- Stylistic origins: Ambient; easy listening; eclecticism; electronic; elevator music; psychedelic; light music; lounge music; new-age; soundscape; Berlin school; computer music; krautrock; planetarium; soundtrack; Drone Music
- Cultural origins: Early 1970s, Germany and Japan

Fusion genres
- Space disco; space rock

Other topics
- Meditation music; program music; space-themed music

Space music, also called spacemusic or space ambient, is a subgenre of ambient music and is described as "tranquil, hypnotic and moving". It is derived from new-age music and is associated with lounge music, easy listening, and elevator music.

According to Stephen Hill, co-founder of a radio show called Hearts of Space, the term is used to describe music that evokes a feeling of contemplative spaciousness. Hill states that space music can range in character, the sonic texture of the music can be simple or complex, it can be instrumental or electronic, it may lack conventional melodic, harmonic, or rhythmic features, and may be less concerned with the formal compositional schemes associated with other styles of music. Hill proposes that space music can be found within a wide range of genres. Space music may have influences from western classical, world, Celtic, traditional and experimental music.

Hill believes that space music can evoke a "continuum of spatial imagery and emotion", which can be beneficial for introspection, and for developing, through a practice of deep listening, an awareness of the spatiality of sound phenomenon. This type of psychonautic listening can produce a subtle trance-like state in certain individuals which can in turn lead to sensations of flying, floating, cruising, gliding, or hovering.

Hill states that some individuals use space music for both background enhancement and foreground listening, often with headphones, to enable states of relaxation, contemplation, inspiration, and generally peaceful expansive moods; it may promote health through relaxation, atmospherics for bodywork therapies, and effectiveness of meditation. Space music appears in many film soundtracks and is commonly played in planetariums.

Hill describes space music as an eclectic genre released primarily by independent labels. Though it represents a relatively small part of the music market, it has a dedicated audience of enthusiastic listeners.

== Definitions ==
AllMusic defines space music as a subgenre of New Age music. Similarly, mainstream retailer Barnes & Noble, independent online music retailer CD Baby, and RealNetwork's music download service Rhapsody all classify space music as a subgenre of new-age music. Rhapsody's editorial staff writes in their music genre description for space music (listed as a subgenre of new-age music) that "New Age composers have looked upward for inspiration, creating an abstract notion of the sounds of interstellar music."

Stephen Hill, co-founder of the radio show Music from the Hearts of Space (syndicated nationally in the United States on National Public Radio) uses the phrase "contemplative music, broadly defined" as an overview to describe the music played on his station, along with the term "spacemusic". He states that the "genre spans historical, ethnic, and contemporary styles", and that it combines elements from many cultures and genres, blended with varieties of acoustic and electronic ambient music, "woven into a seamless sequence unified by sound, emotion, and spatial imagery." In his essay "New Age Music Made Simple", and in introducing the 200th broadcast of the Hearts of Space radio program, Hill has referred to space music as a sub-category of New Age.

Hill's partner Anna Turner (co-host and original co-producer of Music from the Hearts of Space) wrote in her 1989 essay entitled "Space Music" that "New Age Space music carries visions in its notes; it is transcendent inner and outer space music that opens, allows and creates space... this music speaks to our present moment, to the great allegory of moving out beyond our boundaries into space, and reflexively, to the unprecedented adventures of the psyche that await within."

Gerardo "Pkx" Martinez-Casas, original host, producer and creator of KUSF's 90.3 FM, University of San Francisco in California, "Moondance (The Beyond Within)" 1981– 198?, described space music as electronic, environmental and spiritual fine art fashion cosmic sounds as an aid and tool for cultural, contemplative, meditative, social and spiritual awareness.

In her book The New Age Music Guide, author, editor and music critic P. J. Birosik classifies space music as a subgenre of new-age music, as does Dallas Smith, writer, teacher and recording artist in his essay New Age Jazz/Fusion. Steven Halpern, noted recording artist and workshop leader writes that space music has been considered a synonym for new-age music: " 'Space' is a vital dimension of new-age music; so much so that one of the early appellations for the genre was simply 'space music', referring both to its texture and to the state that it tended to evoke in the listener."

John Diliberto, the host of the radio show, Echoes, and creator of WXPN's Star's End, has stated that space music is related to electronic music, as has Bay Area musician, composer and sound designer Robert Rich, who considers space music to be a combination of Electronic music influences from the 1970s with world music and "modern compositional methods". Forest, host of Musical Starstreams refers to space music as a separate genre along with Ambient music, and others including dub, downtempo, trip hop, and acid jazz in the list of genres he calls "exotic electronica". Similarly, WXPN Radio's Star's End, programming ambient music since 1976, on its website lists space music as a separate genre, along with Ambient, new-age, and others.

Steve Sande, freelance writer for the San Francisco Chronicle considers space music to be "Anything but New Age," and writes that "spacemusic [is] also known as ambient, chill-out, mellow dub, down-tempo." In the same article, he describes Stephen Hill's "Hearts of Space" spacemusic program as streaming ambient, electronic, world, new-age and classical music. In contrast to this, according to author and National Endowment for the Arts researcher Judith H. Balfe, Billboard editor Jerry Wood describes space music as one of several "genres within the genre" of new-age music.

== Variety ==
As described by Stephen Hill, the predominant defining element of spacemusic is its contemplative nature. Within that overview, Hill's definition of space music includes a wide variety of styles, instrumentation and influences – both acoustic or electronic.

Many space music recording artists specialize in electronic forms, evolving out of the traditional Kosmische musik of the Berlin School (also known as Krautrock).

Author and classical music critic David Hurwitz describes Joseph Haydn's choral and chamber orchestra piece, The Creation, composed in 1798, as space music, both in the sense of the sound of the music, ("a genuine piece of 'space music' featuring softly pulsating high violins and winds above low cellos and basses, with nothing at all in the middle ... The space music gradually drifts towards a return to the movement's opening gesture ... "); and in the manner of its composition, relating that Haydn conceived The Creation after discussing music and astronomy with William Herschel, oboist and astronomer (discoverer of the planet Uranus).

== Historical usage of the term ==
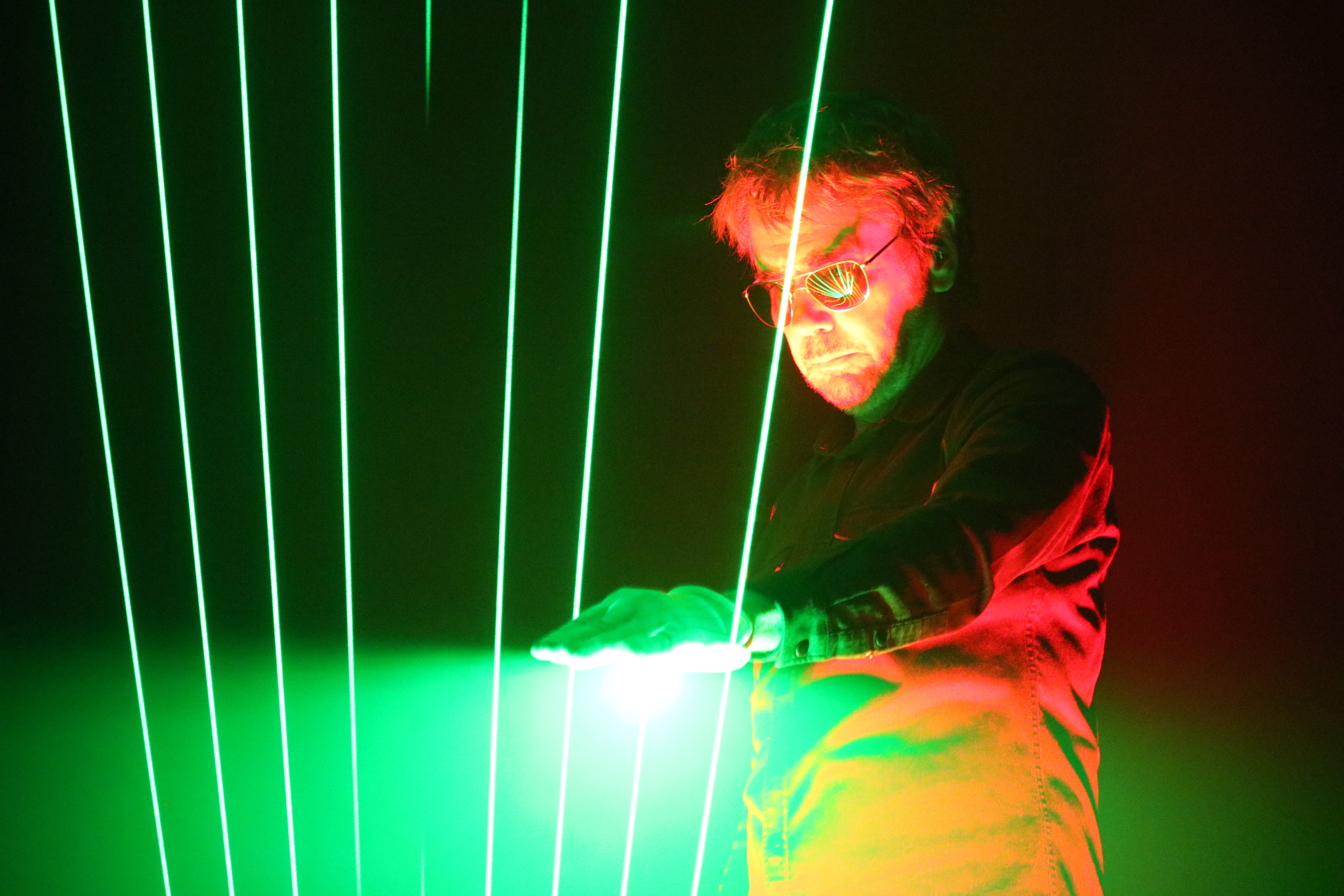
Jean Michel Jarre, a space music artist, performing with a laser harp

In 1928, the German composer Robert Beyer published a paper about "Raummusik" (spatial music), which is an entirely different sense of the term. Karlheinz Stockhausen, who became a colleague of Beyer in Cologne in 1953, used the expression "space music" in this sense when describing his early development as a composer: "The first revolution occurred from 1952/53 as musique concrète, electronic tape music, and space music, entailing composition with transformers, generators, modulators, magnetophones, etc., the integration of all concrete and abstract (synthetic) possibilities within sound (also all noises) and the controlled projection of sound in space." In the sense meant here, he stated in 1967, "Several have commented that my electronic music sounds 'like on a different star', or 'like in outer space.' Many have said that when hearing this music, they have sensations as if flying at an infinitely high speed, and then again, as if immobile in an immense space." A number of Stockhausen's later compositions (not all of them electronic music) take outer space as their theme: Sternklang (Star Sound, 1971), Ylem (1972), Sirius (1975–77), several components of the opera-cycle Licht (Weltraum (Outer Space, 1991–92/1994), Michaelion (1997), Komet (Comet, 1994/1999), Lichter—Wasser (Lights—Waters, 1998–99)), and the so-called "Urantia" subcycle of Klang (Sound, 2006–2007), extending from its thirteenth "hour", Cosmic Pulses to its twenty-first "hour" Paradies.

Music historian Joseph Lanza described the emerging light music style during the early 1950s as a precursor to modern space music. He wrote that orchestra conductor Mantovani used new studio technologies to "create sound tapestries with innumerable strings" and in particular, "the sustained hum of Mantovani's reverberated violins produced a sonic vaporizor foreshadowing the synthesizer harmonics of space music."

Jazz artist Sun Ra used the term to describe his music in 1956, when he stated that the music allowed him to translate his experience of the void of space into a language people could enjoy and understand.

Physicist Werner Meyer-Eppler had been inspired by Homer Dudley's 1948 invention of the Vocoder and began in 1951 to work with a device known as a Melochord, in conjunction with magnetic tape recorders, leading to a decade of working at the Studio for Electronic Music (WDR) specializing in "elektronische Musik" using magnetic tape recorders, sine wave generators and serial composition techniques.

In 1969, Miles Davis was introduced to the music of Stockhausen by young arranger and cellist, and later Grammy award winner, Paul Buckmaster, leading to a period of new creative exploration for Davis. Biographer J. K. Chambers wrote that "The effect of Davis's study of Stockhausen could not be repressed for long. ... Davis's own 'space music' shows Stockhausen's influence compositionally." His recordings and performances during this period were described as "space music" by fans, by music critic Leonard Feather, and by Buckmaster who stated: "a lot of mood changes – heavy, dark, intense – definitely space music."

In the late 1960s and early 1970s, the Grateful Dead developed a new form of improvisational space music in their extended formless jam sessions during live concerts (which their fans referred to as "Space" though the band did not formally assign that title), and their experimental space music albums such as Aoxomoxoa, and later in the 1980s, Infrared Roses and Grayfolded. Band member Phil Lesh released experimental space music recording Seastones with computer music pioneer Ned Lagin in 1975, one of the first albums to be issued in the innovative but commercially unsuccessful format SQ-Quadwith. Lagin used in real-time stage and studio performance of minicomputers driving real-time digital to analog converters, prior to the commercial availability of digital synthesizers in the early 1980s.

The Czech-American composer Václav Nelhýbel, released in 1974 a record named Outer Space: Music by Vaclav Nelybel. From the liner notes: "Ingenious use of echo, artificial reverberation and electronic alterations gives the music in this category a weird, spooky futuristic, 'out of this world' quality, well-suited to super-natural happenings of any kind. Piano, drums and electronic instruments are used to achieve the strange atmosphere and spatial sounds." Vaclav Nelhybel crafts a supernatural world, describing nebulae, meteors, star clusters and craters on Mars with sounds natural and manipulated to tell the story of cosmic space.

Beginning in the early 1970s, the term "space music" was applied to some of the output of such artists as Vangelis, Jean-Michel Jarre, Klaus Schulze and Tangerine Dream, due to the transcendent cosmic feelings of space evoked by the sound of the music and enhanced by the use of the emerging new instrument, the synthesizer, and also in part to the "outer space" themes that are apparent in some of their works. These space music explorations diverged from traditional pop-song formats into longer less structured compositions. Following their early influence on the development of space music, Tangerine Dream later produced increasingly rock-influenced works that are not generally described as space music.

In 1971–72, Sun Ra brought his "space music" philosophy to UC Berkeley where he taught as artist-in-residence for the school year, creating notoriety among the students by devoting the second half-hour of each class to solo or band performances. In 1972, San Francisco public TV station KQED producer John Coney, producer Jim Newman, and screenwriter Joshua Smith worked with Sun Ra to produce a 30-minute documentary film, expanded into a feature film released in 1974, entitled Space Is the Place, featuring Sun Ra's Arkestra and filmed in Golden Gate Park.

In 1973, Berkeley radio producers Anna Turner and Stephen Hill used the phrase in the title of their local public radio show Music from the Hearts of Space. They developed an innovative segue music assembly technique, cross-mixing "spacey" instrumental pieces to create a sustained mood. The term began to be used more widely when the show was syndicated nationally in 1983. Other U.S.-based radio programmers adopted the term as well, among them, John Diliberto, Steve Pross, and Gino Wong with Star's End, launched in 1976, Frank J. Forest (a.k.a. "Forest") with Musical Starstreams, launched in 1981 and nationally syndicated in 1983, and John Diliberto again with Echoes, launched in 1989.

== In film and television soundtracks ==
Examples of space music in film soundtracks include the Vangelis score to Blade Runner, Tangerine Dream's moody soundtracks for Legend, Sorcerer and Risky Business, Jonn Serrie's surround-sound score for the IMAX short film, Hubble: Galaxies Across Space and Time, Brian Eno's score for the 1989 film For All Mankind, and Michael Stearns' soundtrack for the 1985 IMAX film, Chronos, broadcast on Stephen Hill's Hearts of Space radio, on the film's opening night

Television science-fiction series Babylon 5 was scored by former Tangerine Dream member Christopher Franke, released on compact disc in 1996 on Franke's independent label Sonic Images. The scores for many of the Babylon 5 TV movies and numerous Babylon 5 episodes were also released by Sonic Images. In 1994, the German TV station Bayerischer Rundfunk launched the television program Space Night, featuring a constant flow of satellite and space images accompanied by space music programmed by European chill-out-DJ Alex Azary.

== See also ==
- Ambient music
- Chill-out music
- Downtempo
- Drone music
- Electronic music
- List of electronic music genres
- Music of the Spheres
- Program music
- Sound map
- Soundscape
- Space disco
- Space rock
- Synthesizer
