= Galactic Zoo Dossier =

Studio album by Kingdom Come
- Released: October 1971
- Recorded: 1971
- Studio: Rockfield, Regent Sound, and Olympic, London
- Genre: Acid rock; progressive rock; jazz rock
- Length: 49:22
- Label: Polydor
- Producer: Arthur Brown; Kingdom Come; Mike Finesilver; Peter Ker

Kingdom Come chronology
Galactic Zoo Dossier (1971)	Kingdom Come (1972)

Arthur Brown chronology
The Crazy World of Arthur Brown (1968)	Galactic Zoo Dossier (1971)	Kingdom Come (1972)

Galactic Zoo Dossier is the debut studio album by British rock band Kingdom Come, known as Arthur Brown's Kingdom Come in North America. The album is a departure from the sound of lead singer Arthur Brown's previous band, The Crazy World of Arthur Brown, encompassing acid rock, progressive rock and jazz rock.

The majority of the album was recorded at Rockfield Studios and released in 1971 by Polydor Records. Despite being a commercial flop upon release, it has been regarded in recent years as an overlooked masterpiece. Marco Rossi of Record Collector said that "1971's Galactic Zoo Dossier is splenetic and heroically unravelled acid-rock, which occasionally snaps into focus to startling effect."

== Background and recording ==
Following the collapse of The Crazy World of Arthur Brown, band leader Arthur Brown joined a handful of projects, namely Strangelands, Rustic Hinge, and the Puddletown Express. After the demise of the latter of these projects, Brown founded Kingdom Come in September 1970, after meeting bassist Dennis Taylor in Glastonbury. After asking Brown if he had any plans for future projects, Brown mentioned his idea of forming a band called Kingdom, in reference to King Arthur. Taylor suggested the name Kingdom Come, and the two decided then to form the band, with Taylor becoming the band's tour manager.

After recruiting lawyer Mark Radcliffe as their manager, they put out an advert in the music press. Michael "Goodge" Harris replied, who became the band's organist. Around the same time, the band also recruited Bob Ellwood on guitar and Dave Ambrose on bass. After jamming with drummer Rob Tait and percussionist Pete Bailey (the recordings of which being later released on 1995's aptly-titled Jam), Ellwood was fired. Tait then joined the band as their drummer, while Bailey was dropped. Around this time, the band approached Polydor England about a record deal, who turned them down. They then approached Polydor Germany, who signed them and gave them an advance of £10,000. Tait was fired thereafter due to him wanting the band to follow a looser, jazzier sound, with Andrew McCulloch of King Crimson replacing him. Shortly after, Andy Dalby was recruited on guitar, who brought along Julian Paul Brown on synths. This lineup of the band used the advance from the record label to rent a basement studio in Covent Garden, where they rehearsed for three months, sorting out material that would later be recorded for the album. Brown said of writing material that "the guitarist would, for instance, start with a riff. And we'd go round the room until everyone had added a little something to it. Then we'd begin again with a keyboard idea, and once more go round the room with everyone contributing. So, that's how we built up the music for the album." During these sessions, McCulloch and Ambrose wound up being replaced with drummer Martin "Slim" Steer and bassist Desmond Fisher, this lineup being the one that would go on to record the album.

While some of the recording took place in Regent Sound Studios in London, where popular bands such as The Rolling Stones and Black Sabbath had previously recorded, most of the sessions took place in Rockfield Studios, with the album being finalized in Olympic Studios. Brown said of recording at Rockfield that "The owners Charles and Kingsley Ward were real characters and made us feel very welcome." Co-producing the album with the band were Mike Finesilver and Peter Ker.

== Music and production ==
According to Classic Rock Magazine: "Synths railed against guitars, and Brown himself decided to take the rebellious, uncertain nature of the era and interpret it on record. This was the folk rock of student riots and toppling mores. Unnerving, yet strangely appealing."

The album is a concept album of sorts. On the 2010 CD rerelease, the liner notes describe it as "being about the state of humankind at that time." Brown had been living in the U.S. just before the end of his previous band, and was inspired by some of the things he'd seen on American television, namely footage of the Vietnam War and reports on the death of senator Robert F. Kennedy. In an interview for It's Psychedelic Baby! Magazine, Brown elaborated on the concept, stating that "The concept behind the album – and stage act – was the confrontation of all the hippie ideals with the actualities of political and police power. It was looking at a spiritual quest in the context of earning money, assassination, wrongful arrests, and it was posed in terms of us all being prisoners in a Galactic Zoo."

"There was a lot of inherent violence in the States. But this was juxtaposed with those who still promoted and believed in peace. Living in such a wildly extreme country, where you could witness opposite viewpoints all the time made me think about the way we behave as human beings. And the way in which we were being trapped. It was very much like we were all in a zoo."

— Arthur Brown explaining how living in the U.S. influenced the message of the album.

=== Songs ===
The album opens up with "Internal Messenger", which begins with a tongue-in-cheek religious message. According to Roger Smyth, in a review of the album for Salient Magazine, "Galactic Zoo Dossier starts with deceptive timidity with a religious message (tongue held firmly in cheek) audible from amid a confused pile up of voices, but then proceeds to range (or perhaps ramble) over a large number of modern musical forms." The majority of the album segues seamlessly together, similar to later releases by other bands, such as Pink Floyd's The Dark Side of the Moon or XTC's Skylarking. For the title track "Galactic Zoo", Brown "told the guys to imagine they were creatures stuck in one area and running around trying [sic] escape, in a constant state of motion forever attempting to find a way out."

"What I wanted from them was music that captured this feeling of being trapped and looking for the loophole which lets you out. That's what they did, and that's what you hear. This is where we were as humans. Lost in our own maze."

— Arthur Brown discussing his idea behind the song "Galactic Zoo".

Both "Space Plucks" and “Creation” were originally written for Brown's earlier project, Strangelands, where they were originally titled "Planets Of The Universe" and “All Forms And Distinctions” respectively.

Similarly, tracks that were released on the 1995 album Jam, being recorded in 1970, were reworked for this album. “Inconstant Wisdom” contains a section that would later become “Creep”, while “Water” (unrelated to their 1972 song of the same name) has elements that would be reshaped into “No Time” lyrically and “Metal Monster” musically, and “The Finger” was an early version of “Sunrise”. Additionally, “Water” from the self-titled 1972 album comes from the track “Waterfall”.

The fourth track on the album, "Metal Monster", is notable for having an effect that sounds similar to that of a CD skipping. It is unknown how they got this sound. Marco Rossi of Record Collector singles out this track; "Top fried moment? The fucked stereo effect in Metal Monster, where it sounds as though your CD is being chewed into submission (it isn't)."

"Sunrise" was released on the 1996 CD box set Supernatural Fairy Tales: The Progressive Rock Era. A live medley of "Internal Messenger", "Creation", and "Gypsy Escape", performed at the 1971 Glastonbury Festival, was released in the 1972 film about the event and its soundtrack.

== Release ==
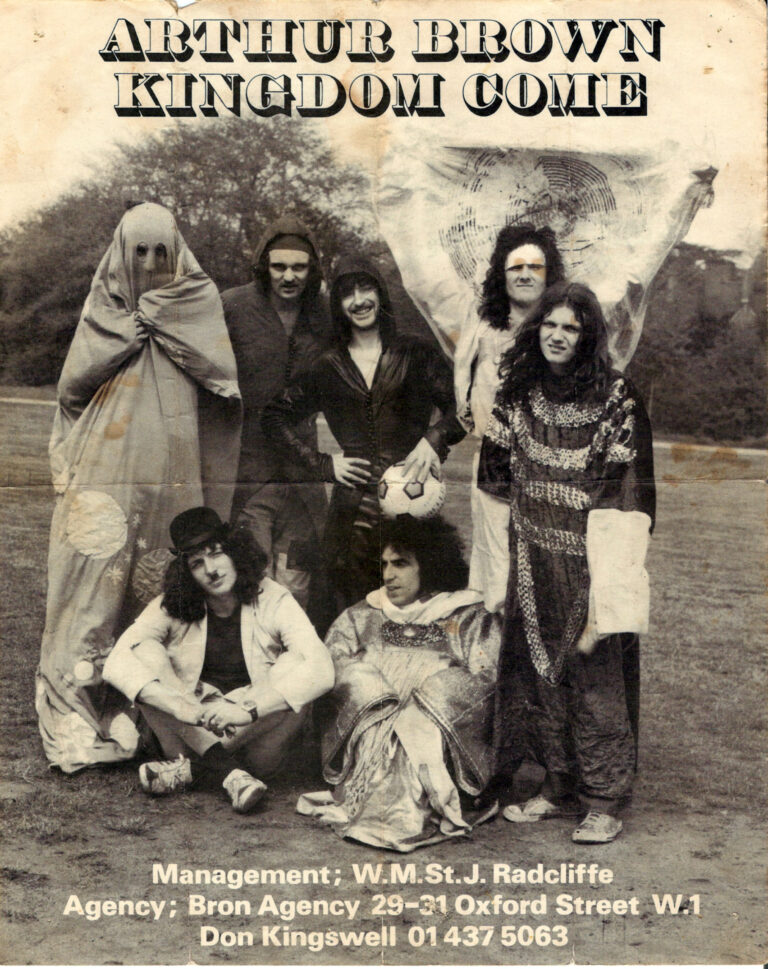
A promotional photo taken around the time of the release of the album.

The album was released in October 1971 by Polydor Records. It was the first of a three record deal with the German wing of the Polydor label. It was commercially unsuccessful, and as a result, the band was marketed in the United States as Arthur Brown's Kingdom Come, in hopes that including his name would boost sales. Contrary to rumour, the name change had nothing to do with the 80's band of the same name. In support of the album, both before and after its release, the band toured around Europe, most notably playing at the Rainbow Theatre with Alice Cooper (who described the band as "true psychodrama!") and playing the pyramid stage at the 1971 Glastonbury Festival. In a review of the Rainbow Theatre gig, Michael Wale for The Times wrote that what was "good to record about this particular piece of pop theatre is that the music was much stronger than Arthur Brown's previous groups have been in the past." The band also recorded four different sessions with the BBC, three of which were later released.

The album has been rereleased on CD multiple times, initially in 2003 on the Castle Music label, featuring three bonus tracks; "Sunrise (Alternate Version)", "Metal Monster (Alternate Version)", and "Space Plucks Dem Bones". These bonus tracks also appear on the 2010 remaster on Esoteric Recordings, and on the first disc of the 2021 CD box set Eternal Messenger (An Anthology 1970-1973); the box set also features three of the four aforementioned BBC sessions of the fifth disc, At The BBC 1971 - 1972.

== Reception and legacy ==
Professional ratings
Review scores
Source	Rating
AllMusic	3/5 stars
The Encyclopedia of Popular Music	2/5 stars
Record Collector	3/5 stars
Hip Planet	(very favourable)
Prog Archives	4/5 stars

Galactic Zoo Dossier was a commercial flop upon release, however it has garnered some praise in recent years. In the AllMusic review for the album, it notes the drastic difference between Kingdom Come and the Crazy World of Arthur Brown, stating that "While there was still a carnivalesque classical-jazz-rock organ base to the arrangements, guitar also took a prominent role, and the melodies were far gloomier and more obtuse." They also mention the response fans of Brown's previous band may have had, mentioning that "its lack of melodic bluesy riffs and unrelentingly demanding themes (and sometimes downright dissonant tunes) must have alienated a good chunk of Crazy World of Arthur Brown fans." In a more positive review, Ben Miler from Hip Planet declares "Galactic Zoo Dossier is simply one of the most twisted albums you'll ever hear", while also stating "The only reject cut on Galactic Zoo is "Trouble". That song was apparently sung by guitarist Andy Dalby, and was definitely [sic] written by him. Pretty cheesy number with some really badly written lyrics ("I would like to write a song/To tell the world what is wrong with it today/I would like to write a book/If that were all it took, To make its troubles go away"), you can tell right away that Arthur Brown wouldn't dare write anything that bad." Record Collector notes that you'll "witness the super-tight interplay of Internal Messenger, the deft jazz-rock dexterity of No Time, and the prog-lite prestidigitation of the instrumental Gypsy Escape."

The track "Creep" was sampled in the track "Burgundy Whip" by MED, Blu, and Madlib, off of their 2015 collaborative studio album Bad Neighbor.

== Track listing ==
All tracks are written by Arthur Brown and Kingdom Come, except where noted.

Side one
No.	Title	Writer(s)	Length
1.	"Internal Messenger"	A. Brown, Mike Finesilver, Peter Ker	5:09
2.	"Space Plucks"	A. Brown, Vincent Crane	3:21
3.	"Galactic Zoo"	A. Brown, Andy Dalby, Michael Harris	2:33
4.	"Metal Monster"	A. Brown, Harris	2:03
5.	"Simple Man"	A. Brown, Dennis Taylor	3:07
6.	"Night Of The Pigs"		1:04
7.	"Sunrise"		6:52

Side two
No.	Title	Writer(s)	Length
8.	"Trouble"	Dalby	2:07
9.	"Brains"	Kingdom Come, Vivian Stanshall	0:57
10.	"Medley:": a. "Galactic Zoo (Part Two)"; b. "Space Plucks (Part Two)"; c. "Galactic Zoo (Part Three)"	A. Brown, Dalby, Harris	3:17
11.	"Creep"		0:47
12.	"Creation"	A. Brown, Taylor, Drachen Theaker, Mitch Mitchell, Nisar Ahmad Khan, Andy Rickell	3:19
13.	"Gypsy Escape"	Taylor, Harris	7:38
14.	"No Time"	A. Brown, Harris	6:28

Bonus tracks on all releases after 2003
No.	Title	Writer(s)	Length
15.	"Eternal Messenger" (Previously released as a non-album single)	A. Brown, Mike Finesilver, Peter Ker	3:58
16.	"I.D. Side To B Side The C Side" (Previously released as B-side to "Eternal Messenger")	A. Brown, Kingdom Come, Alan O'Duffy	4:18
17.	"Sunrise (Alternate Version)"	A. Brown, Dalby, Harris, Desmond Fisher, Julian Brown, Martin Steer	6:33
18.	"Metal Monster (Alternate Version)"	A. Brown, Harris	1:50
19.	"Space Plucks Dem Bones" (Previously released on Strangelands as "Planets Of The Universe")	A. Brown, Crane	5:52

== Personnel ==
Kingdom Come

- Arthur Brown – lead vocals
- Andy Dalby – guitar; lead vocals on "Trouble"
- Desmond "Des" Fisher – bass guitar
- Julian Brown – VCS 3 synthesizer, backing vocals
- Michael "Goodge" Harris* – organ
- Martin "Slim" Steer – drums

Production

- Mastered by Tony Arnold
- Produced by Kingdom Come, Mike Finesilver, and Peter Ker
