= Journey (Kingdom Come album) =

Studio album by Kingdom Come
- Released: April 1973
- Recorded: November–December 1972
- Studios: Rockfield Studios, Monmouthshire
- Genres: Progressive rock; space rock; electronic rock
- Length: 41:49
- Label: Polydor Records
- Producers: Arthur Brown; Dennis Taylor; Dave Edmunds

Kingdom Come chronology
Kingdom Come (1972)	Journey (1973)

Arthur Brown chronology
Kingdom Come (1972)	Journey (1973)	Dance (1975)

Journey is the third and final studio album by British rock band Kingdom Come, known as Arthur Brown's Kingdom Come outside the UK. After the band featured drastically different styles on their first two albums, and after several line-up changes, band leader Arthur Brown worked the band towards a new direction for Journey. The album was the first album in history to use a drum machine responsible for all the percussive sounds on the album. The drum machine in question was the Bentley Rhythm Ace, manufactured by Ace Tone. Although the band had commented the album was entirely based on the drum machine, the band attempted to, in rock and electronic terms, create an album that was the closest they could get "to a string quartet". The album features other experimental techniques, including using a triangle to guide guitar playing and extensive use of Mellotron and synthesizers from new member Victor Peraino, who replaced Michael "Goodge" Harris early on production.

The album was recorded in November 1972 in Rockfield Studios and released in 1973 by Polydor Records. The album was not a popular release, although has gone on to be regarded as a groundbreaking and innovative album that was ahead of its time. Although overlooked upon release, it has received generally positive retrospective reviews from critics. Alan Holmes of Freq said that "Journey was so far ahead of its time that you have to keep checking the sleeve to make sure that it really does say 1973 and not 1983" and that the album was "not only Arthur Brown’s masterpiece, but also one of the truly great albums of the seventies."

== Background and recording ==
After the collapse of The Crazy World of Arthur Brown in 1969, when keyboardist Vincent Crane and drummer Carl Palmer left to eventually form Atomic Rooster, band leader Arthur Brown worked with a varied group of musicians on projects called Strangelands, Puddletown Express, and (briefly) the Captain Beefheart-influenced Rustic Hinge, and eventually founded Kingdom Come in 1970, chiefly including guitarist Andy Dalby, who was the only consistent member after Brown himself. The band recorded their debut album Galactic Zoo Dossier in 1971 and their sophomore release Kingdom Come in 1972, but by the end of the 1972, the band's line up had changed drastically several times over, at that point featuring vocalist Brown, guitarist and vocalist Andy Dalby, bassist, percussionist and vocalist Phil Shutt, and synthesiser/keyboard player Michael "Goodge" Harris.

Although their first two albums featured drastically different styles, Brown and the band decided their third album would mark another drastic change of direction, conceiving an album to feature a drum machine due to their lack of drummer. The band entered Rockfield Studios, Monmouthshire in November 1972. The sessions began with Dennis Taylor supervising proceedings, but he only recorded two songs with them, being replaced by former Love Sculpture guitarist Dave Edmunds, who according to Brown was "more than keen to work on an experimental project". Mixing the album was completed in December 1972. As with the band's previous albums, they took acid during production, and Goodge decided to leave the band because of this. Victor Peraino was his replacement, who was into "sonic sensibilities and recording structures." Brown stated in an interview at the time that band's three albums were intended to present a thematic progression, with their debut focusing on the state of humankind in the present, the second on the human animal itself and the dichotomy between the body and mind, and Journey focused on cosmic and spiritual matters. He saw Journey as the final album in the series, completing a trilogy.

== Music and production ==
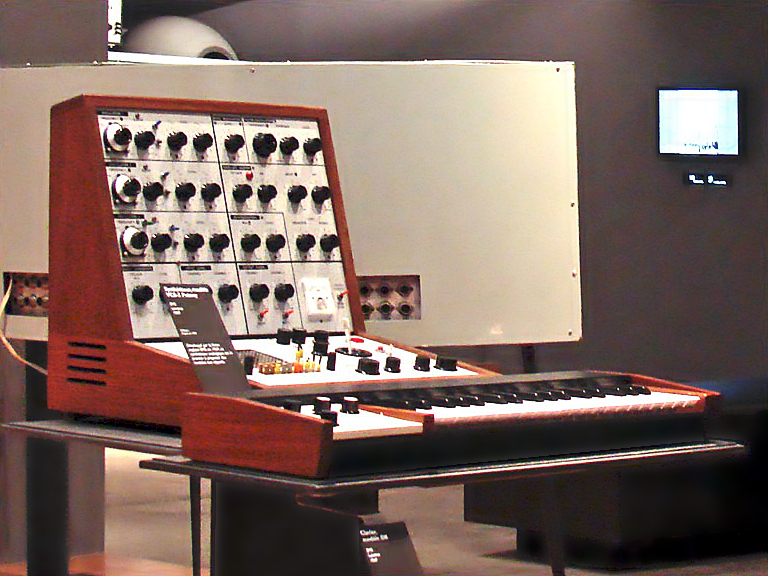
Victor Peraino used the EMS VCS 3 synthesizer on the album.

Describing Journey, Brown said his band were "attempting to do, in rock and electronic terms, the closest we could get to a string quartet. So the parts for guitar, bass and guitar were written with this in mind". Journey is most noted for being the first ever album where a drum machine is responsible for all the percussive sounds on the album. Richie Unterberger of Allmusic said that the album has been "most noted in retrospect as one of the first rock records to use a drum machine, which was still quite a novelty back in 1973." Brown recalled "the whole album is based around the drum machine, and we had a lot of ideas that we wanted to explore using this technology. The drum machine they used was the Bentley Rhythm Ace, the British version of the FR-1, manufactured by the Ace Tone company of Japan. (Ace Tone later evolved into the Roland Corporation.) According to journalist Malcolm Dome, one of the things that made Journey "a remarkably extravagant experiment is the fact that all those connected were open to the most outlandish possibilities.

Richie Unterberger said that, besides being the first drum machine-based rock album, "in other respects it was also a departure from Kingdom Come's previous sound, with the songs not quite as doom-suffused as their first album (Galactic Zoo Dossier) or as whimsical as their second (Kingdom Come), if just as intense in their philosophical questing." He called it an "uneven experience, dwelling in the darker side of early-'70s prog rock, but also touching on heavy metal, jazz, science fiction electronics, and blues from time to time" with "cold electronic touches (including synthesizer and mellotron)." Journey was purportedly the third in a loose conceptual series. A reviewer for Julian Cope's Head Heritage called the album "drum-machine propelled space-glam" that "positively gushed with transcendent energy and light." He stated that it "shows just how complex you can get your grooves (even with a Bentley Rhythm Ace in charge of the drums) and how space rock and progressive rock moves need not be a block to great tunesmithery and can be gainfully mixed with soul-revue ecstatic(s) and proto-glam rock glam descends." The album also makes prominent use of the EMS VCS 3 and ARP 2600 synthesisers and Mellotron M400 keyboard, all of which are played by Victor Peraino.

=== Songs ===
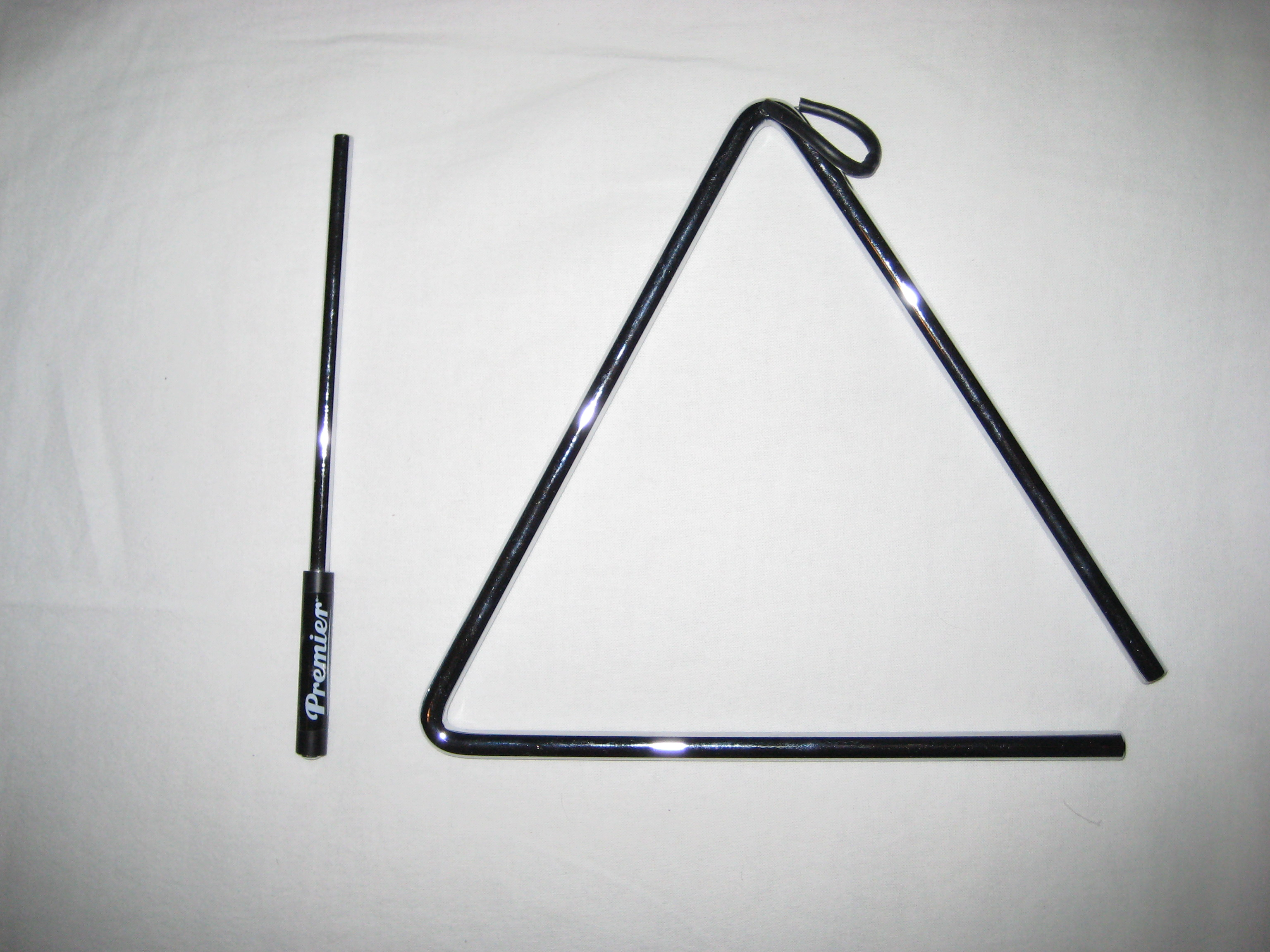
Brown conducted the guitar playing on "Triangles" using a triangle instrument.

The album begins with "Time Captives", which begins with a 4/4 slow drum machine beat. According to Head Heritage, "although electronic, the tone gives it a curiously pagan feel – like the (slightly) speeded up death-march of the damned familiar to many Third Ear Band tracks. Bass and deep washes of white noise quiver underneath as the speed picks up." They called it a "space rock" "The Chain" because "the beat is joined by wa-guitar and funky-but-ominous sounding synthesiser. Everything goes crazy for a second until it gradually settles down into a great motorik groove, and a hugely base riff of warbling notes of moog and bubbling VSC3." Brown's vocals on the song refer to Time Captains, "synthesising the rays powering your brain...lone protons [and] cosmos cold socks." "Triangles" is a slower piece that has been compared to 1974-era Cluster "twilight stroll", with a "ploddingly simple drum machine groove and toy-town flickering synthesisers and guitars," wobbling through "a number of increasingly intense key changes before lurching to a stop." Brown used an actual triangle to guide the guitar playing on the track. Head Heritage, considering it to have predated similar krautrock music, said that, "recorded at the end of 1972, this could easy have come off Ralf and Florian or Zuckerzeit." According to Unterberger said that "Triangles" contains "serene swoops". "Gypsy" makes extensive use of the Mellotron and is "smothered in strings and flutes."

"We took a triangle, which is simply a frame and moved it up and down the fretboard. And ended up playing only those notes that came within the space in the centre of the triangle! It gave us a different tone"

— Arthur Brown explaining how he used a triangle to guide the guitar playing in "Triangles".

Side two begins with the three-part suite "Superficial Roadblocks" contains a "celestial quasi-choral tone of sections." One reviewer said it "soars in with brass and choir providing the main chordal backdrop. This track has to be one of the most Mellotron-heavy ever, with an unaccompanied choir section on Corpora Supercelestia." Another said it was "gorgeous, ethereal; indeed, its some of the best choral ‘tron this side of Aguirre, joined as it is by rolling timpani." “Conception” crawls into "earshot fantastically, with a deadbeat dole-queue flanged bass," whilst “Spirit of Joy” is "features that rarest of M400 sounds, the Mellotron Hammond (along with some strings), only distinguishable when Peraino attempts some organ 'chops'." "Come Alive" is "an 8 minute space-prog epic. Clipped bass, fat fizzing synthesiser, and a blues riff that they bring down into the depths, betraying their 60s psych roots, as Arthur riffs on some semi-improvised poetry which he lays over the top." The song, "earthier" and riff-driven, was the album's only attempt to create a "proper song", as Goodge had referred to it; Goodge suggested the song before his departure and created the start of the development of the song.

== Release ==
The album was released in 1973 in the UK by Polydor Records and in the US by Passport Records. Explaining the album title, Arthur Brown said "I had this song which had the line ‘I’m going on a journey/I’m not coming back’, and it was Phil [Curtis] who suggested we call the album Journey – and we never really did come back." As with the album, the live tour that accompanied the album used the Bentley Rhythm Ace for all the percussion instead of a live drummer, which was similarly innovative as it "went against what people knew." Brown hoped to take the drum machine into areas that were both remarkable and interactive, saying that "Charlie Charles and I wanted to have a flexible machine that could literally respond like a drummer. In fact, I think it was when drummers eventually got hold of the machine that things opened up in terms of the possibilities. I also had the idea of using dance movements and feeding these into a drum machine, to see what comes out". A single version of "Spirit of Joy" was released as a single in the UK by Polydor Records in 1973, featuring the previously unreleased B-side "Come Alive". The band also recorded three of its songs in a live Peel Session for the John Peel BBC Radio 1 show on 25 September 1972.

Journey was Kingdom Come's last album, as Brown departed to India to discover his "inner journey". The album was re-released by Gull in Germany in 1976, and has been remastered for CD in several occasions, each time with bonus tracks; it was first remastered in Arnies Shack in 1993 by Voiceprint Records with four bonus alternate takes of songs, none of which were titled on the release then in 2003 by Castle Music with the same bonus tracks and two BBC live sessions, and most recently in 2010 by Esoteric Recordings, which came with a bonus disc of the alternative takes and a John Peel session from the period.

== Reception and legacy ==
Professional ratings
Review scores
Source	Rating
AllMusic	2/5 stars
Freq	(very favourable)
Head Heritage	(very favourable)
Planet Mellotron	4.5/5 stars

Journey was largely ignored on the release, but retrospectively had received generally positive reviews from critics. Richie Unterberger of AllMusic rated the album two stars out of five and said "it's a Kingdom Come record, which by definition is an uneven experience, dwelling in the darker side of early-'70s prog rock, but also touching on heavy metal, jazz, science fiction electronics, and blues from time to time. The cold electronic touches (including synthesizer and mellotron) and the bleak time-of-reckoning-has-come melodies limited its appeal. But there were gleams of other more tuneful pastures occasionally." However, Planet Mellotron gave the album four and a half stars out of five and said "Journey's a Mellotron classic. Buy," and Head Heritage said the album is "a drum-machine propelled space-glam masterpiece that positively gushed with transcendent energy and light. It shows just how complex you can get your grooves (even with a Bentley Rhythm Ace in charge of the drums) and how space-rock and progressive rock moves need not be a block to great tunesmithery and can be gainfully mixed with soul-revue ecstatic(s) and proto-Glam Rock glam descends." Prog Archives were also favourable, saying it was "the band's most accomplished work, featuring new musicians, plenty of mellotron and synths — a highly entertaining space prog rock album altogether."

Journey is considered to be a widely innovative release that was "ahead of its time," and is considered underrated. Mark Paytress said the album "remains a classic of pioneering electronic rock, up there with Kraftwerk and assorted krautrock trailblazers." Alan Holmes of Freq said that "Journey was so far ahead of its time that you have to keep checking the sleeve to make sure that it really does say 1973 and not 1983. Nowhere is this more apparent than on opening track “Time Captives"– imagine the shock of playing this record for the first time in 1973 and being faced with a full minute of minimal drum machine before a one note bass and guitar riff enter and proceed to speed up and slow down while atonal electronics swirl around for a further three minutes. Taken on its own, this opening section could easily be passed off as a lost Cabaret Voltaire or RBE track from a decade later, but this is only one aspect of Journey, and as the name suggests, we are taken on a unique trip that had no obvious precedents at the time." He said "it's astonishing to think that Journey was recorded at the same time as Dark Side of the Moon, so much more advanced is it than the more well known work" and commented after the release of the 2010 remaster that "now that this milestone is once more available, maybe it stands a chance of being reassessed not only as Arthur Brown's masterpiece, but also as one of the truly great albums of the seventies." Space rock band Hawkwind named a song "Journey" on their twentieth studio album Alien 4 (1995) in what is believed to be a reference to their guitarist Dave Brock's enthusiasm for Arthur Brown and Journey. In 2002 Arthur Brown did a guest appearance in the Hawkwind video Out of the Shadows covering the song Time Captives.

== Track listing ==
All songs written by Kingdom Come.

=== Side one ===
1. "Time Captives" – 8:18
2. "Triangles" (instrumental) – 3:16
3. "Gypsy" – 9:09

=== Side two ===
4. "Superficial Roadblocks" – 6:56
  1. "Lost Time"
  2. "Superficial Roadblocks"
  3. "Corpora Supercelestia"
5. "Conception" – 2:06
6. "Spirit of Joy" – 3:15
7. "Come Alive" – 8:46

=== 1993 bonus tracks ===
8. "Spirit of Joy" (alternate version)
9. "Time Captives" (alternate version)
10. "Conception" (alternate version)
11. "Come Alive" (alternate version, part 1)
12. "Come Alive" (alternate version, part 2)

=== 2003 bonus tracks ===
8. "Spirit of Joy" (Alternate Take)
9. "Time Captives" (Alternate Take)
10. "Conception" (Alternate Take)
11. "Come Alive" (Alternate Take)
12. "Slow Rock" (BBC Session)
13. "Spirit of Joy" (BBC Session)

=== 2010 bonus disc ===
1. "Spirit of Joy" (Single Version) 2.50
2. "Slow Rock" (B-side to "Spirit of Joy") 3.55
3. "Time Captives" (alternative version) 7.08
4. "Conception" (alternative version) 2.01
5. "Come Alive" (alternative version) 8.23
6. "Slow Rock" (Live Peel Session, 5 September 1972) 7.08
7. "Spirit of Joy" (Live Peel Session, 5 September 1972) 8.36
8. "Triangles" (Live Peel Session, 5 September 1972) 3.10

== Personnel ==
- Phill Shutt (later known as Phil Curtis) – bass guitar, percussion, vocals
- Arthur Brown – vocals, drum machine programming
- Andy Dalby – electric guitar, vocals
- Victor Peraino – Mellotron, ARP 2600, EMS VCS 3, piano, theremin, percussion, vocals
