= Phil Curtis =

English session musician and bass guitarist (1951–2018)

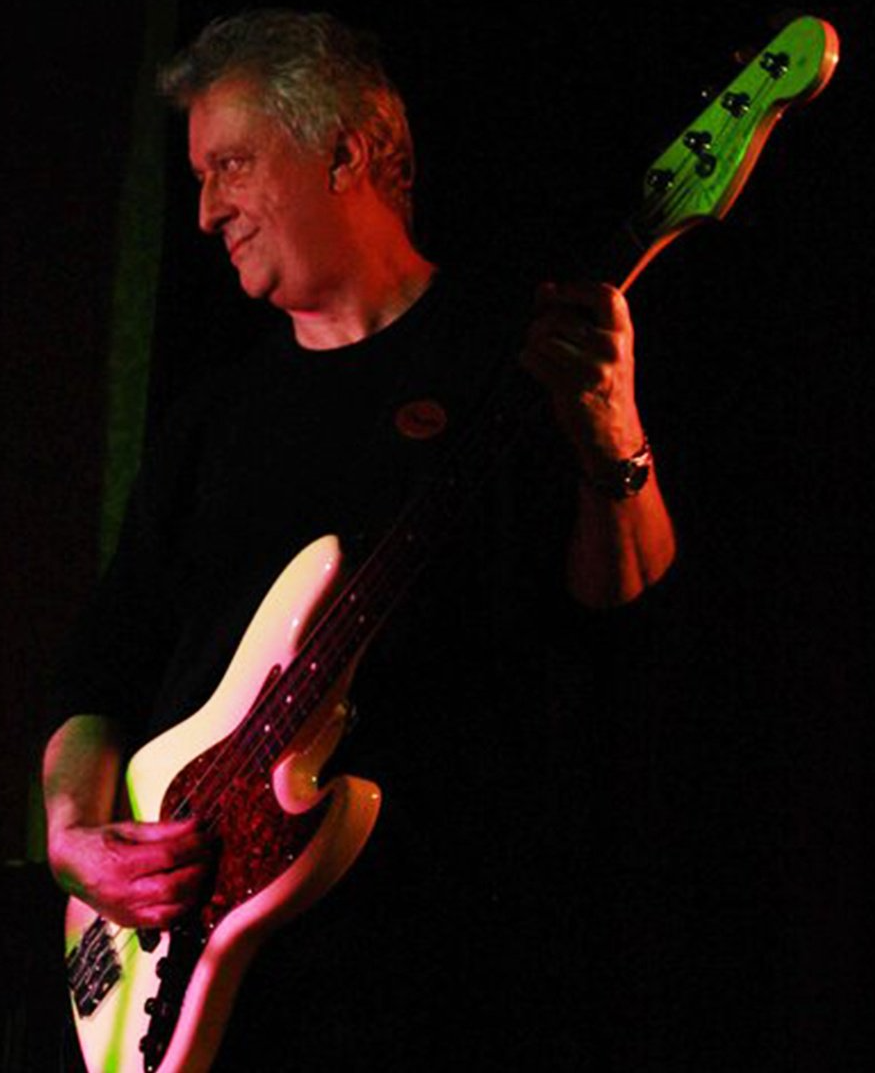
- Phil live with The Invisible Opera Company of Tibet, 2010.
- Born: Phillip Shutt; 31 March 1951; Newton Longville, Buckinghamshire
- Died: 14 March 2018 (aged 66)
- Other name: Phil O'Sophical Curtis
- Occupations: Musician, Bass Guitarist, Sound Engineer, Composer
- Notable work: Arthur Brown, Kiki Dee, Chris Rea, Vapour Trails, Larry Carlton, Gilbert O'Sullivan, The Bay City Rollers, The Invisible Opera Company of Tibet

Phillip Edwin Lionel Shutt (31 March 1951 – 14 March 2018), known professionally as Phil Curtis, was an English session musician and bass guitarist known for his work with Arthur Brown, Kiki Dee, Steve Gibbons, Larry Carlton, Chris Rea, Gilbert O'Sullivan, John Morgan, Denny Laine, Steve Marriott, The Bay City Rollers and many others.

In his later years he worked as a composer for television and radio, as a sound engineer and as an educator.

Phil was born in Newton Longville, Buckinghamshire in 1951. His first instrument was the trumpet, which he picked up at the age of 6 before switching to bass guitar during his school years. He joined his first band, The Stormbeats, in 1961, playing at the local cinema on Saturday mornings. When asked on his motivation for becoming a musician, Phil claimed that it was "to get girls!".

Phil went on to study music at Watford College of Music before moving to London in pursuit of a career in music.

== Early career ==
In 1968 Phil joined The Spirit of John Morgan. The group toured the UK extensively. In May 1968 the band began a fortnightly residency at the Marquee Club in London alongside Jethro Tull and 10 Years After.

The group recorded their self-titled debut in September 1969 at Olympic Studios for the Carnaby Label. Their second album "Age Machine" was released in 1970.

Phil was briefly a member of the Steve Gibbons Band. Phil also rehearsed with Thunderclap Newman around this period but decided against joining the group - the band went onto have a #1 single with Something In The Air.

== Arthur Brown & Kingdom Come ==
Phil joined Arthur Brown's Kingdom Come in October 1971 as replacement for Desmond Fisher. In the early days of the group Phil, Arthur Brown and Andy Dalby lived together in a band commune in Beckenham and occasionally crossed paths with a young David Bowie. Phil recorded bass, vocals and percussion on two Kingdom Come albums: Kingdom Come (1972) and Journey (1973). Phil helped cement the title "Journey", as Arthur Brown explained in the liner notes for the 2010 re-release:

"I had this song which had the line ‘I’m going on a journey/I’m not coming back’, and it was Phil who suggested we call the album Journey – and we never really did come back.”

The band were renowned for their theatrical stage shows and exuberant costumes. Phil played the role of the Pope on stage. He sported a Golden cassock and headdress with the black and white face-paint that had become Arthur Brown's signature.

“We all wore costumes. And we had a light show projecting images onto a gauze screen that you could lower or raise. You could make us disappear behind images, or appear in the middle of those images- As though we were part of the picture. We had huge cartoon figures that went into the audience. It was a multimedia presentation…. one of the band became a traffic light and wore that costume. There was the captain of the ship - of consciousness that society was trying to force to come back aground- so I wore a huge boat around me. There was death. There was the school master. There was the Pope. And so on, and all these had costumes.” - Arthur Brown interviewed in 2012.

"Journey" was recorded at Rockfield Studios in Monmouthshire, Wales. Whilst it had originally been planned that Dennis Taylor would produce the album, Dave Edmunds, who was also at Rockfield during the time, expressed an interest in the record and took over the producer role. It was the first rock album ever to use a drum machine (The Bentley Rhythm Ace) exclusively.

The album was released in 1973 by Polydor in the UK and Passport Records in the US. It was considered a pioneering album and has retrospectively gained praise from critics: "Journey was so far ahead of its time that you have to keep checking the sleeve to make sure that it really does say 1973 and not 1983… not only Arthur Brown’s masterpiece, but also one of the truly great albums of the seventies."

Author and journalist Mark Paytress said the album "remains a classic of pioneering electronic rock, up there with Kraftwerk and assorted krautrock trailblazers."

"Journey" was rotated on Radio Luxembourg. During this period Kingdom Come opened for Duke Ellington’s Orchestra.

Arthur Brown has since called it a "classic album."

Phil's time with Arthur Brown's Kingdom Come culminated in 3 BBC Radio 1 John Peel Show Sessions in 1971 and 1972. These were later included in both the 2003 and 2010 re-releases of "Journey" by Castle Music and Esoteric Recordings respectively. The Peel Sessions were recorded at Kensington House, Shepherd's Bush and Maida Vale 4.

A Kingdom Come live album titled "Live 1973" was released by Gonzo Multimedia on 31 March 2017 (coincidentally Phil Curtis’ 66th Birthday). The album features Kingdom Come's performance at Manchester Free Trade Hall on 24 April 1973.

Kingdom Come reunited in 2005 as a part of Arthur Brown's Otherworld concert at the London Astoria. Alongside the reunion of the original Kingdom Come members Arthur Brown, Phil Curtis, Andy Dalby and Goodge Harris, other guests on the night included Pete Brown, Phil May, Dick Taylor, Captain Sensible and Howard Marks.

== The Kiki Dee Band ==
Phil became a member of the Kiki Dee Band in January 1974.

=== Recordings ===
Phil recorded bass on The Kiki Dee Band's one and only album "I’ve Got The Music In Me" which was released in 1974 by Elton John's Rocket Record Company. The album was recorded at Marquee Studios, a recording studio connected to the Marquee Club in Wardour St, London as well as additional recording at Jimi Hendrix's Electric Lady Studios in New York. "I’ve Got The Music In Me" was also released as a single on 26 July 1974, peaking at #12 in the US Billboard Hot 100 Chart and #19 in the UK Charts.

Phil also contributed bass to Kiki Dee's 1977 self-titled album, performing on the songs "Chicago" and "First Thing In The Morning". "First Thing In The Morning" was released on 19 February 1977, peaking at #32 on the UK Charts. "Chicago" was released as a single later that year on 11 June 1977, reaching #28 on the UK Charts.

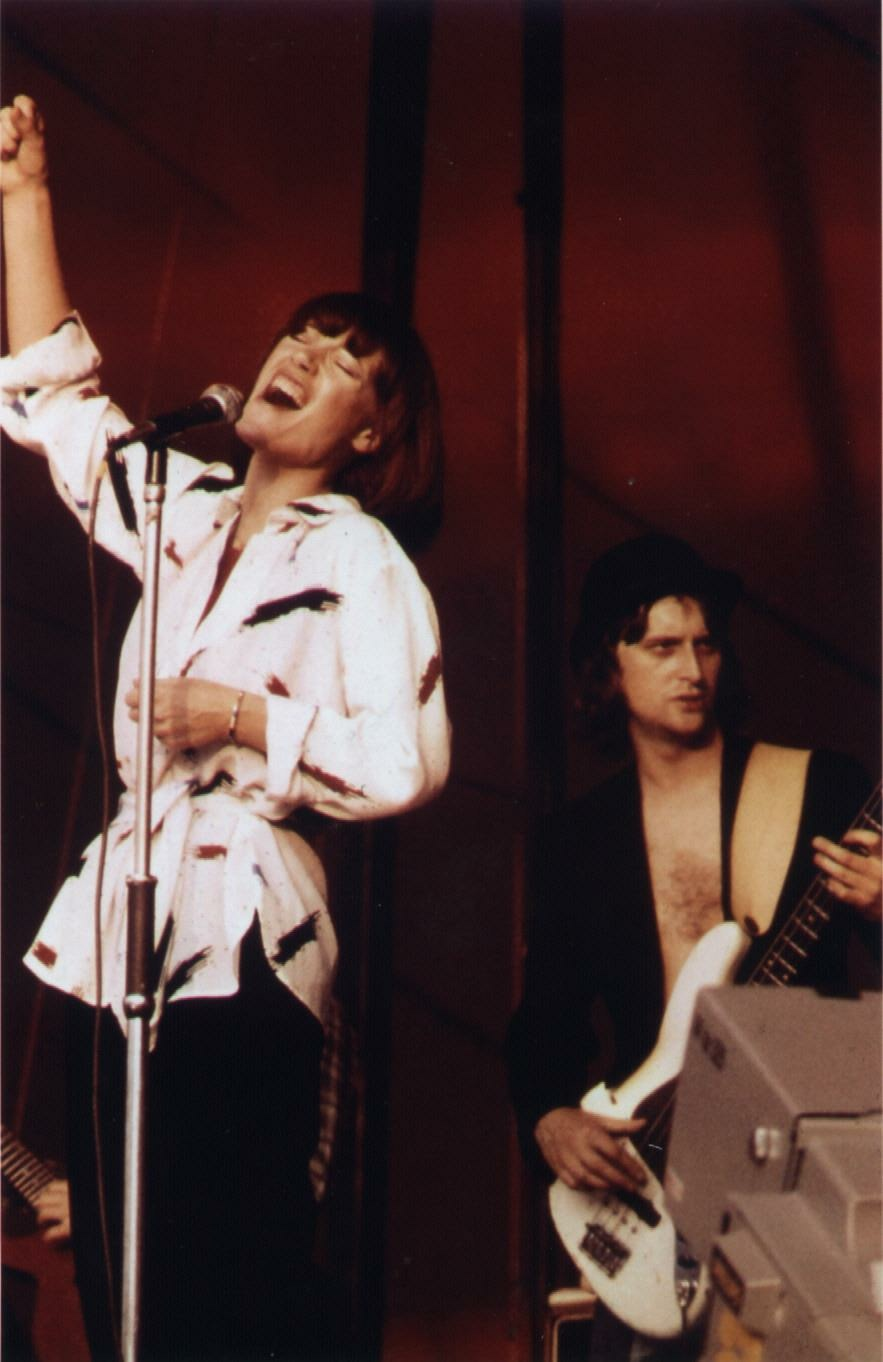
Phil Curtis (right) with Kiki Dee in support of Queen at Hyde Park, 1976.

=== UK & USA Tours and support slots with Elton John, Queen, Steely Dan and more ===
The band toured intensely throughout 1974 - touring the UK 3 times over the course of the year.

1974 also saw the band embark on a 22 date US Tour through June and July in support of Steely Dan, The Beach Boys, The James Gang and The Guess Who, followed by a 43 date US tour in support of Elton John for his Greatest Hits Tour. This tour included 4 nights at the Los Angeles Forum and 2 nights at Madison Square Gardens in New York as well as other stadium venues around the USA. The Kiki Dee Band travelled alongside Elton John's entourage in The Starship, the renovated Boeing 720-022 private jet used by Led Zeppelin for their 1975 US Tour:

“No more messing about at airports this was first class all the way. In fact much better than first class. Limousines with police escorts to the airport and then your own plane painted with the tour date on it waiting for you. On the plane was a bar with an organ at one end. Lounge chairs and even a bedroom with a fire place for the top of the bill…” - Stuart Epps, Tour Manager for the Kiki Dee Band on Elton John’s 1974 US Tour, describes The Starship.

John Lennon travelled with the Elton John and Kiki Dee Band touring party on The Starship for 28 November 1974 Madison Square Garden concert. He later joined Elton John and the band onstage for renditions of "Lucy In The Sky With Diamonds", "Whatever Gets You Through The Night" and "I Saw Her Standing There". Lennon joined the touring party for the after show party at the Waldorf Astoria.

In 1975 The Kiki Dee Band embarked on a headline tour of the UK from February to March. March 1975 also saw the band record for the BBC at the Paris Theatre in London.

On 18 September 1976 The Kiki Dee Band supported Queen in Hyde Park, London. Between 150,000 - 200,000 attended the all day concert which remains a record breaking figure in Hyde Park's history.

November 1976 saw the band embark on another 14 UK Tour, finishing at the Royal Albert Hall in London on 2 December. The band were joined onstage by Elton John as a surprise guest at St George's Hall in Bradford on 21 November 1976. The support band for this tour was the Vapour Trails, who Phil also played bass for alongside fellow former Kingdom Come member Andy Dalby on guitar and John McBurnie on vocals.

=== BBC Sessions and Television Appearances ===
Phil appeared numerous times on Top of the Pops with Kiki and the band in 1974 and 1975 performing "I’ve Got The Music in Me". He also appeared on The Old Grey Whistle Test (Season 4, Episode 7) as well as International television shows such as Germany's Musikladen.

The Kiki Dee Band recorded several sessions for BBC Radio and Television. In March 1975 the group were recorded for BBC Radio's "In Concert" series. The band were featured on BBC Sight and Sound on 26 February 1976, performing 12 songs at The Hippodrome in Golders Green, London.

== Tiger ==
In 1976 Phil joined Tiger, founded by London session musician Big Jim Sullivan (who had played on over 750 charting singles and 54 #1 hits during his session career.)

Tiger were mostly a studio band though they did appear as support act on Hawkwind's 1976 UK Tour and at Reading Festival 1976. Phil played bass on the debut album "Tiger" which was released by Warner Brothers in the US and EMI in the UK.

== Vapour Trails ==
Phil formed his own band called Vapour Trails with friends and musicians he had met during his time with Arthur Brown and Kiki Dee.

Vapour Trails toured as The Kiki Dee Band (of which Phil, Andy Dalby and Vapour Trails singer John McBurnie were both members) during her 1976 UK Tour.

In the late 1970s Phil moved to Los Angeles with the Vapour Trails. The core members were John McBurnie on vocals (The Kiki Dee Band) and Andy Dalby (Kingdom Come) on guitar. Other musicians involved in the group included English keyboardist Brian Chatton and Wings drummer Steve Holley.

In 1979 The Vapour Trails recorded their self-titled debut in 1979 after negotiating a $3 million recording contract with Warner Brothers. The album was produced and remixed by Larry Carlton at his private studio, Room 335, in Hollywood. The self-titled album has been described as "a great album of Westcoast Pop".

It was re-released in 1980 under the name The VT's and titled "Autumn Breeze" by Polystar in Japan, where the band had a large following due to the use of the album's title track "Don’t Worry Baby" as theme song for the hit Japanese music show Best Hit USA. "Don’t Worry Baby" remained the theme song of the show from its debut airing in 1981 until its finale in September 1989. As a result of this, the song became one of the most well-known non-Japanese songs among the Japanese population.

The album has been re-released numerous times, most recently in 2008 by Wounded Bird Records.

== Session career ==
Phil's career as a session player in the 1960s and 1970s saw him work with many notable artists, including Chris Rea (on his critically acclaimed debut album “Whatever Happened to Benny Santini?”), Gilbert O’Sullivan and The Bay City Rollers, who Phil toured Japan with as part of their backing band during the 1970s.

An incomplete Discography of Phil's session and recording work can be found below.

=== Singles ===
- (1969) "Ride On/Along Came John" - (The Spirit of John Morgan) - Carnaby
- (1970) "Age Machine" - (The Spirit of John Morgan) - Carnaby
- (1970) "I Want You" - (The Spirit of John Morgan) - Carnaby
- (1970) "The Floating Opera Show/Never Let Go" - (The Spirit of John Morgan) - Carnaby/Colombia
- (1973) "Spirit of Joy" - (Arthur Brown’s Kingdom Come) - Polydor
- (1974) "Hard Luck Story" - (The Kiki Dee Band) - The Rocket Record Company
- (1974) "I’ve Got The Music In Me/Amoureuse" - (The Kiki Dee Band) - The Rocket Record Company
- (1975) "Step By Step" - (The Kiki Dee Band) - The Rocket Record Company
- (1975) "How Glad I Am" - (The Kiki Dee Band) - The Rocket Record Company
- (1975) "Someone To Me/Do It Right" - (The Kiki Dee Band) - The Rocket Record Company
- (1977) "Chicago" - (Kiki Dee) - The Rocket Record Company
- (1977) "First Thing In The Morning" - (Kiki Dee) - The Rocket Record Company
- (1979) "Do The Bossa Nova/Night People" - (Vapour Trails) - Warner Bros. Records
- (1980) "What’s In A Kiss" - (Gilbert O'Sullivan) - CBS
- (1980) "I Love It But" - (Gilbert O'Sullivan) - CBS
- (1980) "Hello It’s Goodbye" - (Gilbert O'Sullivan) - CBS
- (2013) "Lilith" - (The Invisible Opera Company of Tibet) - Self Release
- (2013) "Tried So Hard" - (The Invisible Opera Company of Tibet w/Daevid Allen) - Dakini Records

=== Albums ===
- (1969) "Spirit Of John Morgan" - (The Spirit Of John Morgan) - Carnaby
- (1969) "Age Machine" - (The Spirit Of John Morgan) - Carnaby
- (1972) "Kingdom Come" - (Arthur Brown’s Kingdom Come) - Polydor
- (1973) "Journey" - (Arthur Brown’s Kingdom Come) - Polydor
- (1974) "I’ve Got The Music In Me" - (The Kiki Dee Band) - The Rocket Record Company
- (1975) "The Kiki Dee Band - Stereo Pop Special 90" - (The Kiki Dee Band) - BBC Transcription Services
- (1976) "Tiger" - (Tiger) - Warner Bros. Records
- (1976) "The Lost Ears" - (Arthur Brown’s Kingdom Come) - Gull
- (1977) "Kiki Dee" - (Kiki Dee) - The Rocket Record Company
- (1977) "People of The Wind (Soundtrack)" - (G.T. Moore & Shusha) - Carolyn
- (1977) "Chisholm In My Bosom" - (Arthur Brown) - Gull
- (1978) "Whatever Happened to Benny Santini?" - (Chris Rea) - United Artists Records
- (1978) "First Offence" - (Bunk Dogger) - RCA Victor
- (1979) "Vapour Trails" - (Vapour Trails) - Warner Bros. Records
- (1980) "Off-Centre" - (Gilbert O’Sullivan) - CBS
- (1999) "Roller-coaster" (Sound Engineer) - (Nightporters) - Indigo
- (2003) "The Reluctant Dog" - (Steve Holley) - Angel Air Records
- (2011) "Live At Sonic Rock Solstice 2011" - (The Invisible Opera Company of Tibet) - Dakini Records
- (2014) "Songs From The Temple Of Now" - (The Invisible Opera Company of Tibet) - Dakini Records
- (2015) "Drones4Daevid’ - (Various) - Real Music Club
- (2017) "Live 1973" - (Arthur Brown’s Kingdom Come) - Gonzo Multimedia
- (2018) "Love Song: Previously Unreleased 1977 - 1986" - (Lesley Duncan) - Celeste

=== DVDs ===
- (2014) "@ Onboard The Craft 2013 Festival" - (The Invisible Opera Company Of Tibet) - Dakini Records

== Later Work ==
Phil retired from the London Music scene in the 1980s. Moving to Devon near his parents, he instead pursued a successful career in the antiques trade.

In the 1990s Phil wrote jingles for Television & Radio as well as working as a sound engineer for various local studios in Torquay and other areas in Devon. He recorded many bands over this period.

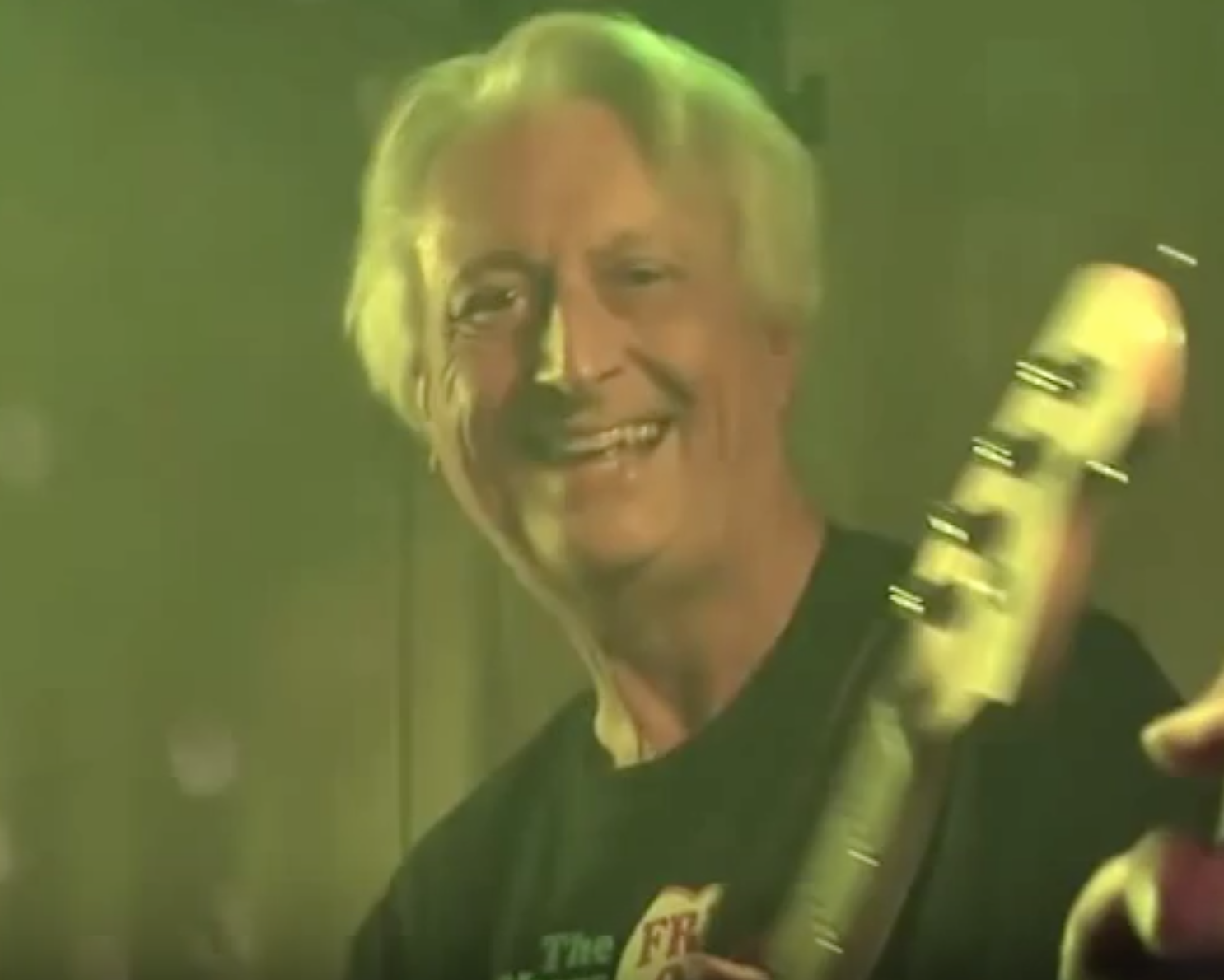
Phil Curtis live in 2013 with The Invisible Opera Company Of Tibet

Phil was a member of The Invisible Opera Company of Tibet, a Devon-based band formed by Brian "Zero" Abbott and Daevid Allen of Gong in 1992. Phil performed regularly with the band - particularly in Glastonbury and Devon - as well as recording 2 Live Albums ("Sonic Rock Solstice" and "Drones4Daevid") and 1 Studio Album ("Songs From The Temple Of Now") during his time with the group. The Invisible Opera Company of Tibet also performed live with Gong founder Daevid Allen in 2013 and also with Arthur Brown in 2015. The band also supported Gong in 2012 in Exeter, UK. Both Allen and Brown appear on The Invisible Opera Company's Studio Album "Songs From The Temple Of Now".

Phil worked as a tutor at dBs Music (formerly Deep Blue Sound) in Plymouth from the early 2000s until 2014. He was hugely influential to students and left a lasting impact on their lives, helping forge many new musical careers and left a lasting legacy with those he worked with. Nigel Burt, Director of dBs Music commented: "Phil Curtis joined the company in the very early days and inspired many students and indeed staff with his knowledge and stories of the music industry. Phil has a wonderful and well-documented career, a great bass player, a musical genius but more importantly, a true gentleman and all round wonderful man."

In his final years Phil spent time in Los Angeles, reuniting with old music friends and collaborating on new work as well as doing more bass sessions.

Phil died on 14 March 2018, aged 66.

Following news of his death Kiki Dee posted a tribute to Phil on her official Twitter account: "I am sad to say Phil Curtis Bass player with the original Kiki Dee band passed away last week, he was a true character and a great musician, plus always fun to be with. My thoughts are with his family."

Former students also left tributes on the dBs Music website and shared their memories: "He was so fundamental in so many student's musical journey. I can say without a doubt that without Phil I wouldn't have the career I do today as a musician. He single handedly convinced me to pursue it and supported me through everything."
