= Gary Peterson =

American record producer

Gary Peterson is an American record producer. He is probably best known as the creator of Golden Throats. Peterson and partner Pat Sierchio produced four volumes of the series for Rhino Records, which collect bizarre examples of celebrities singing pop music classics.

Peterson began as Rhino's first dedicated editor, researching, proofing and overseeing all the information printed on their audio releases, and is credited for embellishing packages with original recording and release information (and often full discographies) in the burgeoning days of the reissue business. He worked for Rhino Entertainment and the Warner Music Group from 1984 to 2004, and eventually produced a number of reissues and compilations of artists such as Todd Rundgren, Warren Zevon, Little Feat, Fleetwood Mac, Captain Beefheart, Devo, The Spinners, Tower Of Power, Chicago, The Doobie Brothers, Michael McDonald, Carly Simon, Linda Ronstadt, Daryl Hall & John Oates, Edgar Winter, Gary Wright, Lee Michaels, Cactus, Poco, Tommy James & The Shondells, and Sammy Davis Jr. Besides Golden Throats, he co-produced other "various artists" collections, such as the Poptopia series which anthologized "power pop" music, and the Supernatural Fairy Tales: The Progressive Rock Era boxed set. Examples of his vault research can be found in Little Feat's Grammy-nominated boxed set Hotcakes & Outtakes, and the reissue of Waiting For Columbus, as well as the expanded reissues of Fleetwood Mac's Rumours and Tusk (which AMG noted as "one of the finest expanded reissues of a classic record yet released.").
