= Fire (Arthur Brown song) =

Song by The Crazy World of Arthur Brown

Single by The Crazy World of Arthur Brown

from the album The Crazy World of Arthur Brown
- B-side: "Rest Cure"
- Released: June 1968 (UK); September 1968 (US)
- Recorded: London, 1968
- Genre: Psychedelic rock
- Length: 2:54
- Label: Track (UK) 604022; Atlantic (US)
- Songwriters: Arthur Brown; Vincent Crane; Mike Finesilver; Peter Ker
- Producers: Kit Lambert; Pete Townshend

The Crazy World of Arthur Brown singles chronology
"Devil's Grip" (1967)	"Fire" (1968)	"Nightmare" (1968)

"Fire" is a 1968 song written by Arthur Brown, Vincent Crane, Mike Finesilver and Peter Ker. Performed by the Crazy World of Arthur Brown, it was released as a single and on the band's debut album, also called The Crazy World of Arthur Brown. The single became a transatlantic hit, reaching number one in the UK and Canada and number two in the United States, while hitting the top 10 in markets across Europe.

== Background ==
The Crazy World of Arthur Brown had been performing the song "Fire" in their live act to highly favorable audience response. When it came time to record an album, Arthur Brown, the band's singer, wanted to record The Fire Suite, a rock opera centered around the song "Fire", which would have focused on the horrors of Hell. Kit Lambert, Brown's manager and the album's producer, dissuaded him against the uncommercial original concept. As a compromise, side A of the vinyl record featured a suite of songs written as part of the album's original concept, including "Fire", while side B featured unrelated songs.

During live performances and in the black and white promotional television clip, Brown performed the song wearing a burning helmet. The helmet was improvised with a leather skull cap onto which was bolted a metal dish that held lighter fluid or petrol. As the cap was not insulated, the heat from the burning fuel quickly conducted through the fixing bolt to the top of Brown's head, causing him considerable pain. Brown claims that the flames got up to 4 feet high and at one point caught fire to his clothes during a performance.

== Recording ==
The song was recorded on four-track reels with instrumentation consisting of drums, keyboard, and Brown's vocals. The drumming was recorded on the same tape as the keyboards. On Ronnie Wood's radio show on November 14, 2011, both Wood and Alice Cooper claim that Wood played bass guitar on the studio recording of the song that was released as a single and appeared on the album The Crazy World of Arthur Brown, but Polly Marshall's biography of Arthur Brown states that "[Wood] must have confused it with the BBC session [on April 8, 1968]." There is no bass guitar on "Fire", only bass pedals.

After the Crazy World of Arthur Brown completed recording sessions for the album, the band embarked on their first American tour, supporting the Doors, Frank Zappa and MC5. After Lambert delivered the album to Atlantic, the label told Lambert that they enjoyed the album but thought that Theaker could not keep time in his drumming, and wanted the drum track re-recorded, an impossibility with the drums and keyboards having been recorded on the same reel. Lambert suggested to Brown that horns and strings be overdubbed to mask the perceived deficiencies. Brown agreed, and Crane wrote the brass arrangements. The overdub sessions took two weeks to record. Brown later said that they were mixing the album for "probably fourteen hours a day". After the remix was done, Lambert's business partner, Chris Stamp, played the acetate for the band during one stop that occurred on their American tour. Approximately four minutes into the acetate, Theaker "leapt across the room, took it off the turntable, smashed it on the wall", claiming that his drumming had been "buried" in the mix. Brown defended the overdubs, saying that they added to the album's overall presentation, replacing visuals and costume changes he would have employed in live performance to achieve dramatic effect. The alternate mixes, before strings and brass were overdubbed, have appeared as bonus tracks on the album's compact disc reissues, in mono only, as this early version of the album's first side was not mixed into stereo.

== Composition ==
The song's lyrics are sung from the perspective of a self-proclaimed "god of Hellfire," destroying, with tremendous glee, everything that his victims have built up over their lives. The song is an example of the psychedelic rock of the period, though its lack of guitars or bass guitar distinguished it from many of its contemporaries. The lead instrument in this case was Vincent Crane's Hammond organ, augmented by an orchestral section featuring prominent brass. The singer's opening proclamation "I am the God of Hellfire" became a lasting catchphrase; the audio effect on the intro is a mixture of artificial reverb and "recording in the toilet, which gave a chamber-type sound". The song ends with the sound of a wind from Hell along with one of Brown's trademark banshee screams.

Credit for the composition of "Fire" on the original vinyl single was to Arthur Brown and Vincent Crane only; however, Mike Finesilver and Peter Ker successfully sued for co-credit and royalties based on melodic similarities to their song "Baby, You're a Long Way Behind".

== Reception and legacy ==
The single reached #1 in the United Kingdom in August 1968 and in Canada in October. Also in October, it reached #2 on the US Billboard Hot 100 and #19 in Australia. It also reached #3 in Germany, #4 in France, #6 in the Netherlands, #7 in Austria, #8 in Ireland, and #18 in Finland. "Fire" sold over one million copies, and was awarded a gold disc. On Canada's Year-end chart it was #23.

"Fire" was covered by Lizzy Mercier Descloux as the fifth track on her 1979 album Press Color. Pete Townshend, the single's associate producer, recorded a version with the Who on Townshend's 1989 album The Iron Man: A Musical. The Crazy World of Brown's original recording was sampled by the band Marilyn Manson, who were influenced by Arthur Brown, on their 1995 single "Lunchbox".

The song was sampled in The Prodigy's song "Fire" from the "Strangely Limited Edition" 12" single "Fire/Jericho", released on 14th September 1992. The "Sunrise Version" of the track featured on their debut album "Experience", which was released two weeks later. The sample reportedly cost XL Recordings £3,000 to be cleared.

The perpetrator of the Christchurch mosque shootings on 15 March 2019 played "Fire" during part of his livestream of the massacre, after which Brown expressed "horror and sadness" at the use of the song and cancelled his "instore" performance the day after.

== Personnel ==
- Arthur Brown – vocals
- Vincent Crane – keyboards, orchestral arrangement
- Drachen Theaker – drums

== Certifications ==
Region	Certification	Certified units/sales
United States (RIAA)	Gold	1,000,000^{^}
^{^} Shipments figures based on certification alone.
