= Amnios =

1991 video game

- Cover art by Roger Dean
- Developer: Flying Chicken Software
- Publisher: Psygnosis
- Platform: Amiga
- Release: 1991
- Genre: Multidirectional shooter
- Mode: Single-player

Amnios is a video game for the Amiga published in 1991 by Psygnosis. It is a top-down, scrolling, multidirectional shooter set on ten planets across ten levels. The futuristic cover art is by Roger Dean.

== Reviews ==
- "Amnios Review". Amiga Action (23): 28–29. Aug 1991.
- Haynes, Rik (Oct 1991). "Amnios Review". CU Amiga: 106–107.
- Ramshaw, Mark (Jan 1992). "Amnios Review". Amiga Power (9): 100.
- Evans, Maff (Jan 1992). "Amnios Review". Amiga Format (30): 84–85.
- Magenauer, Max (Dec 1991). "Amnios Review". Amiga Joker: 60.
- Games-X
