= Z-Star =

Z-STAR
- Origin: London, England
- Genres: Blues rock; psychedelic rock; funk; soul
- Occupation: Musician
- Instruments: Electric guitar, keyboards, bass, drums, vocals
- Label: Muthastar Records
- Website: zstarmusic.com

Z-STAR (pronounced 'zee-star') is the alias of Zee Gachette, a British/Trinidadian singer-songwriter, musician, artist, and record producer based in Brighton and signed to Muthastar Records. Zee has released three albums under the name Z-STAR, Voodoo Dragon Risin (VDR 2000), Who Loves Lives (EMI 2004) and Masochists & Martyrs (Muthastar 2010). Each album is very different with a wide range of songs and sounds.

== Career ==
The latest EP release 16 Tons, is a return to the rock roots. The musical arrangements are written and performed by diverse collective of world class musicians. At the core Zee Gachette (lead vocals, drums, guitars, sounds), Nikolaj Bjerre from Denmark (drums), Mark Meilack from the UK (bass) and Diogenes Baptisttella from Brazil (lead guitar, vocals). Other UK based musicians include; Lee Spreadbury (Keys, Vocals), Sebastien Heintz (Lead Gtr) and Carly Bryant (Keys). It has been said that the band Rock royalty, Jimmy Page and Roger Daltrey, both offered their seal of approval having caught the new sound at the Brighton Music Awards when Z-STAR picked up the best live act award presented by Psychedelic rock legend Arthur Brown. In Spring 2014, Zee launched a crowd-funding campaign through PledgeMusic to raise the funds for the production of the forthcoming album 16 Tons of Love, which is expected in 2017. Z-STAR are currently touring throughout Europe, Russia and Australia, and finishing the album mix.

== Live collective ==
=== Current members ===
- Zee Gachette – lead vocals, rhythm guitar, drums, percussion
- Diogenes Baptisttella – lead guitar, backing vocals
- Sebastien Heintz – lead guitar, backing vocals
- Lee Spreadbury – keyboards
- Mark Meilack – bass, backing vocals
- Daisy Palmer – drums
- Nikolaj Bjerre – drums

== Discography ==
=== Studio albums ===
- 2018: 16 Tons of Love (Muthastar Records)
- 2013: 16 Tons EP (Muthastar Records)
- 2010: Masochists & Martyrs (Muthastar Records)
- 2004: Who Loves Lives (EMI)
- 2000: Voodoo Dragon Risin' (VDR Records)
