= The Crazy World of Arthur Brown (album) =

Studio album by the Crazy World of Arthur Brown
- Released: June 1968
- Recorded: 1968
- Genre: Psychedelic soul
- Length: 38:08
- Label: Track; Atlantic
- Producer: Kit Lambert

The Crazy World of Arthur Brown chronology
The Crazy World of Arthur Brown (1968)	Strangelands (1988)

Arthur Brown chronology
The Crazy World of Arthur Brown (1968)	Galactic Zoo Dossier (1971)

Singles from The Crazy World of Arthur Brown
- 1. "Fire" Released: 1968; 2. "Nightmare" Released: 1968; 3. "I Put a Spell on You" Released: 1968

The Crazy World of Arthur Brown is the debut studio album by the English rock band the Crazy World of Arthur Brown. Released in the United Kingdom in June 1968 by Track Records and in the United States in September 1968 through Atlantic, the album was an international success, propelled by the transatlantic hit single "Fire". It was the only album released during the Crazy World's original incarnation.

A psychedelic soul album, its style is defined by frontman Arthur Brown's wide-ranging theatrical vocals and mystical lyrics, with the first side of the original LP comprising a conceptual song cycle known as "the Fire Suite". The album's sound and Brown's stage act influenced subsequent musicians such as David Bowie, Peter Gabriel, Alice Cooper, Marilyn Manson and George Clinton.

== Recording ==
The Crazy World of Arthur Brown had recorded a single called "Devil's Grip", which had failed to chart. However, Atlantic Records was interested in recording an album of the band's music, and the band went to work on The Fire Suite, a concept album built around their song "Fire", which was popular in their live act. The album was produced by the Who's manager Kit Lambert for his own label, Track Records, with associate production by Pete Townshend. The band line-up consisted of Arthur Brown (vocals), Vincent Crane (organ, piano and vibes), and Drachen Theaker (drums). Bass guitar, where used, was provided by Nick Greenwood; session drummer John Marshall replaced Theaker on two selections. The album was recorded on four-track reels with instrumentation consisting of bass, drums, keyboard, and Brown's vocals. The drumming was recorded on the same tape as the keyboards. On Ronnie Wood's radio show on 14 November 2011, both Wood and Alice Cooper claim that Wood played bass guitar on the single "Fire", but Polly Marshall's biography of Arthur Brown states that "[Wood] must have confused it with the BBC session [on 8 April 1968]." There is no bass guitar on "Fire", only bass pedals.

After recording the album, the Crazy World of Arthur Brown embarked on their first American tour, supporting the Doors, Frank Zappa and MC5. After Lambert delivered the album to Atlantic, the label told Lambert that they enjoyed the album but thought that Theaker couldn't keep time in his drumming, and wanted the drum track re-recorded, an impossibility with the drums and keyboards having been recorded on the same reel. Lambert suggested to Brown that horns and strings be overdubbed to mask the perceived deficiencies. Brown agreed, and Crane wrote the brass arrangements. The overdub sessions took two weeks to record. Brown later said that they were mixing the album for "probably fourteen hours a day". After the remix was done, Lambert's business partner, Chris Stamp, played the acetate for the band during one stop that occurred on their American tour. Brown alleged that approximately four minutes into the acetate, Theaker "leapt across the room, took it off the turntable, smashed it on the wall", claiming that his drumming had been "buried" in the mix. Brown defended the overdubs, saying that they added to the album's overall presentation, replacing visuals and costume changes he would have employed in live performance to achieve dramatic effect.

== Composition ==
The Crazy World of Arthur Brown has a psychedelic soul sound that encompasses British rhythm and blues, psychedelia and pop. Mike Knoop, writing for Classic Rock magazine, said that Brown's singing style recalls "Eric Burdon, Bob Calvert, Ian Gillan, Tim Curry, Brian Connolly, and a smidgen of King Diamond all coming out of one person." Brian Carr, another Classic Rock writer, compared the album's music to that of Alice Cooper and Frank Zappa. Gary Claydon, also for Classic Rock, opined that the album's music was not rock and roll, due to the presence of organ playing instead of guitars.

The album was originally conceived by Brown as The Fire Suite, a rock opera which would have focused on the horrors of Hell. Lambert dissauded him against the uncommercial original concept. As a compromise, side A of the vinyl record featured a suite of songs written as part of the album's original concept, while side B featured unrelated songs, including covers of Screamin' Jay Hawkins' "I Put a Spell on You" and James Brown's "I've Got Money", which had been a part of the band's stage act. The two covers have been called "fine examples of British R&B". The original song "Rest Cure" has been described as "basic pop", while "Spontaneous Apple Creation" was described as the album's most psychedelic recording, due to its high amount of sound effects. "Fire" has been cited as an example of psychedelic rock.

== Release and reception ==
Professional ratings
Review scores
Source	Rating
AllMusic	4.5/5 stars
Classic Rock	2.5/5 stars
The Rolling Stone Album Guide	1/5 stars

The album was released in June 1968 on Track in the UK, and by Atlantic in the United States that September. The album peaked at No. 7 on Billboard's Pop Albums chart, No. 2 on the UK charts, and No. 6 in Canada. The album's first single, "Fire," was a global success, reaching No. 1 in the UK in August 1968, No. 2 on the Billboard Hot 100 in the US in October 1968, No. 1 in Canada also in October, and No. 19 in Australia again in October. "Fire" sold over one million copies, and was awarded a gold disc. It was sampled by the band Marilyn Manson, who were influenced by Arthur Brown, on their 1995 single "Lunchbox". Other artists influenced by the album's sound and Brown's stage performance included David Bowie, Peter Gabriel, Alice Cooper and George Clinton. Due to the album's international success, the Crazy World of Arthur Brown received a £650,000 advance to record a follow-up album. However, the band subsequently broke up after the recording, and their second album, Strangelands, was not released until 1988, almost 20 years after it had been recorded.

Richie Unterberger, writing for AllMusic, called the album "an exhilaratingly reckless slice of psychedelia" in a retrospective review. Of the less favourable retrospective reviews, the staff of Classic Rock gave the album a score of 5.65 out of 10 (rounded to 2.5/5), based on 99 votes from staff writers, and The Rolling Stone Album Guide gave the album 1 star, deeming it to be "English eccentricity at its most daft."

== Track listing ==
Side A
No.	Title	Writer(s)	Length
1.	"Prelude - Nightmare"	Arthur Brown	3:28
2.	"Fanfare - Fire Poem"	Brown; Vincent Crane	1:51
3.	"Fire"	Brown; Crane; Mike Finesilver; Peter Ker	2:54
4.	"Come and Buy"	Brown; Crane	5:40
5.	"Time/Confusion"	Brown; Crane	5:15

Side B
No.	Title	Writer(s)	Length
6.	"I Put a Spell on You"	Screamin' Jay Hawkins	3:41
7.	"Spontaneous Apple Creation"	Brown; Crane	2:54
8.	"Rest Cure"	Brown; Crane	2:44
9.	"I've Got Money"	James Brown	3:09
10.	"Child of My Kingdom"	Brown; Crane	6:11
Total length:			38:08

Finesilver and Ker are not credited as authors of "Fire" on original pressings of the album or attending single.

"Child of My Kingdom" is 7:03 on the compact disc reissues.

"Time" and "Confusion" are indexed as two tracks on the 50th anniversary edition.

2010 Esoteric Recordings reissue disc two
No.	Title	Writer(s)	Length
1.	"Devil's Grip"	Brown	3:22
2.	"Give Him A Flower"	Brown; Crane	3:02
3.	"Music Man" (2009 stereo mix)	Brown; Crane	3:57
4.	"Fire" (first version)	Brown; Crane; Finesilver; Ker	3:05
5.	"Prelude/Nightmare" (alternative mono version)	Brown	3:49
6.	"Fanfare/Fire Poem" (alternative mono version)	Brown; Crane	2:01
7.	"Fire" (alternative mono version)	Brown; Crane; Finesilver; Ker	3:01
8.	"Come and Buy" (alternative mono version)	Brown; Crane	4:25
9.	"Time/Confusion" (alternative mono version)	Brown; Crane	5:39
10.	"Interview with Brian Matthew"		1:16
11.	"Fire Poem / Fire" (BBC Radio 1 session)	Brown; Crane; Finesilver; Ker	4:01
12.	"Come and Buy" (BBC Radio 1 session)	Brown; Crane	2:38
13.	"Nightmare" (soundtrack recording from the film The Committee)	Brown	3:28

50th anniversary edition (2018) disc one (stereo mix) bonus tracks
No.	Title	Writer(s)	Length
12.	"Devil's Grip" (mono A-side)	Brown
13.	"Give Him A Flower" (mono B-side)	Brown; Crane
14.	"Fire" (mono A-side)	Brown; Crane; Finesilver; Ker
15.	"Rest Cure" (mono B-side)	Brown; Crane
16.	"Nightmare" (German mono A-side, single-track vocal edit)	Brown
17.	"What's Happening (alias Music Man)" (mono B-side)	Brown; Crane
18.	"Fire" (stereo single edit)	Brown; Crane; Finesilver; Ker

50th anniversary edition (2018) disc two (mono mix) bonus tracks
No.	Title	Writer(s)	Length
12.	"Fire" (first version)	Brown; Crane; Finesilver; Ker
13.	"What's Happening (alias Music Man)" (stereo mix)	Brown; Crane
14.	"Prelude/Nightmare" (alternative mono version)	Brown
15.	"Fanfare/Fire Poem" (alternative mono version)	Brown; Crane
16.	"Fire" (alternative mono version)	Brown; Crane; Finesilver; Ker
17.	"Come and Buy" (alternative mono version)	Brown; Crane
18.	"Time" (alternative mono version)	Brown
19.	"Confusion" (alternative mono version)	Crane
20.	"Nightmare" (from the film The Committee)	Brown

50th anniversary edition (2018) disc three (rarities and radio sessions)
No.	Title	Length
1.	"I Put A Spell on You" (BBC session recorded 8/4/68, broadcast 28/4/68)
2.	"Fire Poem/Fire" (BBC session recorded 8/4/68, broadcast 28/4/68)
3.	"Child of My Kingdom" (BBC session recorded 8/4/68, broadcast 28/4/68)
4.	"Come And Buy" (BBC session recorded 8/4/68, broadcast 28/4/68)
5.	"Arthur Brown Interview With Brian Matthew" (recorded 8/4/68, broadcast 31/7/68)
6.	"Spontaneous Apple Creation" (recorded 30/6/68, broadcast 03/8/68)
7.	"Nightmare" (radio session)
8.	"I Put A Spell on You" (radio session)
9.	"Fire" (radio session)
10.	"Spontaneous Apple Creation" (radio session)
11.	"Baby You Know What You're Doing" (pre-track recording)
12.	"Don't Tell Me" (pre-track recording)
13.	"The Green Ball" (pre-track recording)
14.	"You Don't Know" (pre-track recording)

== Personnel ==
- Arthur Brown – vocals
- Vincent Crane – Hammond organ, piano, vibes, musical arrangements and orchestration
- Nick Greenwood (billed as "Sean Nicholas") – bass guitar
- Drachen Theaker – drums
- John Marshall – drums (on "I Put a Spell on You" and "Child of My Kingdom")

Additional personnel

- Pete Townshend – associate producer
- Kit Lambert – producer
- David King – cover design
- David Montgomery – photography
- Ed Strait – compilation producer
