= Live (Klaus Schulze album) =

...Live...

Live album by Klaus Schulze
- Released: 1980
- Recorded: 1976(?) & 1979
- Genre: Electronic music, space music
- Length: 132:34 (original); 150:43 (reissue)
- Label: Brain
- Producer: Klaus Schulze

Klaus Schulze chronology
Dune (1979)	...Live... (1980)	Dig It (1980)

...Live... is the twelfth album by Klaus Schulze. It was originally released in 1980, and in 2007 was the twenty-sixth Schulze album reissued by Revisited Records. The album contains recordings from concerts in Berlin in 1976 (according to record sleeve, but may actually be a studio recording from 1977), and Amsterdam and Paris in 1979. The CD version of "Sense" has been extended from the original LP and now includes a lengthy introduction which did not feature in the original release. "Dymagic" includes a vocal performance by Arthur Brown, similar to the one found on Dune, the last studio album before the tour.

== Track listing ==
All tracks composed by Klaus Schulze.

Side one
No.	Title	Length
1.	"Bellistique"	21:24

Side two
No.	Title	Note	Length
1.	"Sense"	51:01 on deluxe version	31:10

Side three
No.	Title	Length
1.	"Heart"	30:50

Side four
No.	Title	Length
1.	"Dymagic"	29:31

Deluxe edition bonus track
No.	Title	Length
5.	"Le Mans au Premier"	17:57

== Personnel ==
- Klaus Schulze – synthesizers
- Harald Grosskopf – drums (on "Sense")
- Arthur Brown – vocals (on "Dymagic")
