= Supernatural Fairy Tales: The Progressive Rock Era =

Compilation album by Various Artists
- Released: 1996
- Genre: progressive rock
- Label: Rhino Records

Supernatural Fairy Tales: The Progressive Rock Era is a 5-CD compilation of progressive rock from around the world. It was curated by Archie Patterson of Eurock, and released by Rhino Records in 1996. The cover art is by Roger Dean, a longtime cover artist for the genre.

Reviews of the set generally note the difficulty of summarizing such a broad and far-reaching genre, as well as the obvious omission of several big-name bands whose music could not be licensed for inclusion. However, several lesser-known tracks from a broad variety of bands make the set an interesting listen.

It was rated three stars by AllMusic.

== Track listing ==
=== Disc 1 ===
1. America - The Nice
2. Paper Sun - Traffic
3. Repent Walpurgis - Procol Harum
4. Private Sorrow/Balloon Burning - The Pretty Things
5. Legend Of A Mind - The Moody Blues
6. Kings & Queens - Renaissance
7. Sympathy - Rare Bird
8. Under The Sky - Pete Sinfield
9. Searching - Klaus Schulze
10. Sunrise - Kingdom Come

=== Disc 2 ===
1. The System/Babylon - Aphrodite's Child
2. Death Walks Behind You - Atomic Rooster
3. Der Vierte Kuss - Ash Ra Tempel
4. Killer - Van der Graaf Generator
5. Oh Yeah - Can
6. Knife-Edge - Emerson, Lake & Palmer
7. In The Land Of Grey And Pink - Caravan
8. It Happened Today - Curved Air
9. Hocus Pocus - Focus
10. Prophet/Marvelry Skimmer - Wigwam

=== Disc 3 ===
1. Perpetual Change - Yes
2. Lothlorien - Argent
3. Ladytron - Roxy Music
4. Radio - Supersister
5. Dear Little Mother - Savage Rose
6. The Musical Box - Genesis
7. Roll Over Beethoven - Electric Light Orchestra
8. New World - Strawbs
9. Celebration - Premiata Forneria Marconi
10. Karn Evil 9: 1st Impression, Parts 1 & 2 - Emerson, Lake & Palmer

=== Disc 4 ===
1. Dancing With The Moonlit Knight - Genesis
2. Siberian Khatru - Yes
3. Virginia Plain - Roxy Music
4. Warrior - Wishbone Ash
5. Warinobaril - Lard Free
6. Mozambique - Amon Düül II
7. Round And Round - Strawbs
8. Questions And Answers - Nektar
9. Fils De Lumiere - Ange
10. Ritorno Al Nulla - Le Orme
11. Without Words - Clearlight

=== Disc 5 ===
1. Star Palace Of The Sombre Warrior - Seventh Wave
2. Perfect Mystery - Gong
3. Free Hand - Gentle Giant
4. War - Henry Cow/Slapp Happy
5. Andra Satsen - Samla Mammas Manna
6. Let's Eat (Real Soon) - Hatfield and the North
7. Traccia II - Banco
8. Troller Tanz (Ghost Dance) - Magma
9. It's A Rainy Day, Sunshine Girl - Faust
10. Mummy Was An Asteroid, Daddy Was A Small Non-Stick Kitchen Utensil - Quiet Sun
11. Radar Love - Golden Earring
12. Inca Roads - Frank Zappa & The Mothers of Invention
