= Kingdom Come (British band) =

1970s British rock band

- Also known as: Arthur Brown's Kingdom Come
- Origin: United Kingdom
- Genres: Psychedelic rock; experimental rock; progressive rock
- Years active: 1970–1974
- Spinoff of: The Crazy World of Arthur Brown
- Past members: Arthur Brown; Andy Dalby; Martin Steer; Phil Shutt; Victor Peraino; Julian Paul Brown; Michael Harris; Desmond Fisher

Kingdom Come were a British rock band fronted by Arthur Brown. The band was recognized for Brown's theatrical and operatic singing, and a sound that drew from psychedelic and progressive rock. This combination made the band a hit on Britain's festival circuit, but lack of record sales, indifference from music critics, and poor record label promotion (especially in the US) led to its eventual demise in 1974.

The band was later marketed as Arthur Brown's Kingdom Come in North America due to name conflicts with an unrelated band with the same name. Despite their lack of commercial success, Kingdom Come's 1973 album Journey has received generally positive retrospective reviews from critics. Alan Holmes of Freq said that "Journey was so far ahead of its time that you have to keep checking the sleeve to make sure that it really does say 1973 and not 1983" and that the album was "not only Arthur Brown's masterpiece, but also one of the truly great albums of the seventies."

The album was also "most noted in retrospect as one of the first rock records to use a drum machine, which was still quite a novelty back in 1973".

== Band history ==
After the collapse of The Crazy World of Arthur Brown in 1969, when keyboardist Vincent Crane and drummer Carl Palmer left to eventually form Atomic Rooster, Brown worked with a varied group of musicians on projects called Strangelands, Puddletown Express, and (briefly) the Captain Beefheart-influenced Rustic Hinge, before finding the musicians who would make up Kingdom Come. Chief among these was guitarist Andy Dalby, who was the only consistent member after Brown himself.

Apart from Brown and Dalby, at the time of their first album, Galactic Zoo Dossier, the band included Julian Paul Brown (no relation, synthesizer), Michael "Goodge" Harris (keyboards), Desmond Fisher (bass), and Martin "Slim" Steer (drums). The band appeared at the 1971 Glastonbury Festival and featured in the accompanying film. By the time of their second album, Kingdom Come, Julian Paul Brown had left and Desmond Fisher was replaced by Phil Shutt, later known as Phil Curtis. Steer left in mid-1972 to be replaced by a drum machine. Harris left shortly before the recording of their final album, Journey, and was replaced by American keyboard and synthesizer player Victor Peraino.

Brown stated in an interview with an English music magazine that the three albums were intended to present a thematic progression. The first focused on the state of humankind in the present, the second on the human animal itself and the dichotomy between the body and mind, and the third on cosmic and spiritual matters.

For synthesizers Kingdom Come used the VCS3, and the Mellotron and theremin also figured prominently in the group's repertoire, especially after the addition of Victor Peraino in the band's line-up. On the final album, Journey, recorded in November 1972, there was no drummer either on the record or on tour; all the drum sounds were from the Bentley Rhythm Ace, an early drum machine manufactured by the Ace Tone company of Japan (Ace Tone later evolved into the Roland Corporation). Journey was the first album on which a drum machine produced all the percussion.

A number of factors contributed to the end of Kingdom Come, including mediocre album sales, critical disdain, the revolving door membership of the band, and Brown's frustration with the music business in general. The band dissolved rather than officially breaking up, with Brown citing a desire to play simpler music and opt for a simpler lifestyle in general in later interviews. Following their split, Peraino returned to Detroit, where he made an album called No Man's Land in 1975 with some local musicians as Victor Peraino's Kingdom Come. Nearly 40 years later, in 2014, Peraino made another album, Journey in Time, under the same group name, this time with guest appearances from Arthur Brown on five of the tracks.

== Discography ==
=== Studio albums ===
- Galactic Zoo Dossier (Polydor, October 1971)
- Kingdom Come (Polydor, October 1972)
- Journey (Polydor, April 1973)
- Jam (Voiceprint, 1995; recorded in 1970)

=== Compilations ===
- The Lost Ears (Gull, 1976)
- Eternal Messenger (An Anthology 1970–1973) (5CD box set) (Esoteric Recordings, 2021)

== Bibliography ==
- Marshall, Polly. The God Of Hellfire, the Crazy Life and Times of Arthur Brown. SAF Publishing. ISBN 0-946719-77-2.
