= Andy Dalby =

English rock guitarist, who was largely active in the 1970s and early 1980s

Andy Dalby (born Andrew Kenneth Dalby, 8 December 1948, Gainsborough, Lincolnshire) is an English rock guitarist, who was largely active in the 1970s and early 1980s.

He was a leading member of Kingdom Come, with which he recorded three albums between 1971 and 1973, and was the only constant member apart from Arthur Brown. After Kingdom Come, he played on Brown's solo albums Dance With Arthur Brown and Chisholm In My Bosom, as well as doing session work.

Dalby performed with Kiki Dee, Vapour Trails, and then Jack Green. He was on two Green albums, Humanesque (1980) and Reverse Logic (1981).

In 1982, he joined the re-formed Camel and appeared on the On the Road 1982 live album.

Dalby reunited with Arthur Brown and other surviving members of Kingdom Come for a one-off concert at the Astoria in London on 12 March 2005.

Between 2022 and 2020, Dalby contributed to the Spirits Burning and Michael Moorcock albums The Hollow Lands and An Alien Heat. He also played guitar on the 2021 Spirits Burning album Evolution Ritual.
