= Arthur Brown (musician) =

English singer (born 1942)

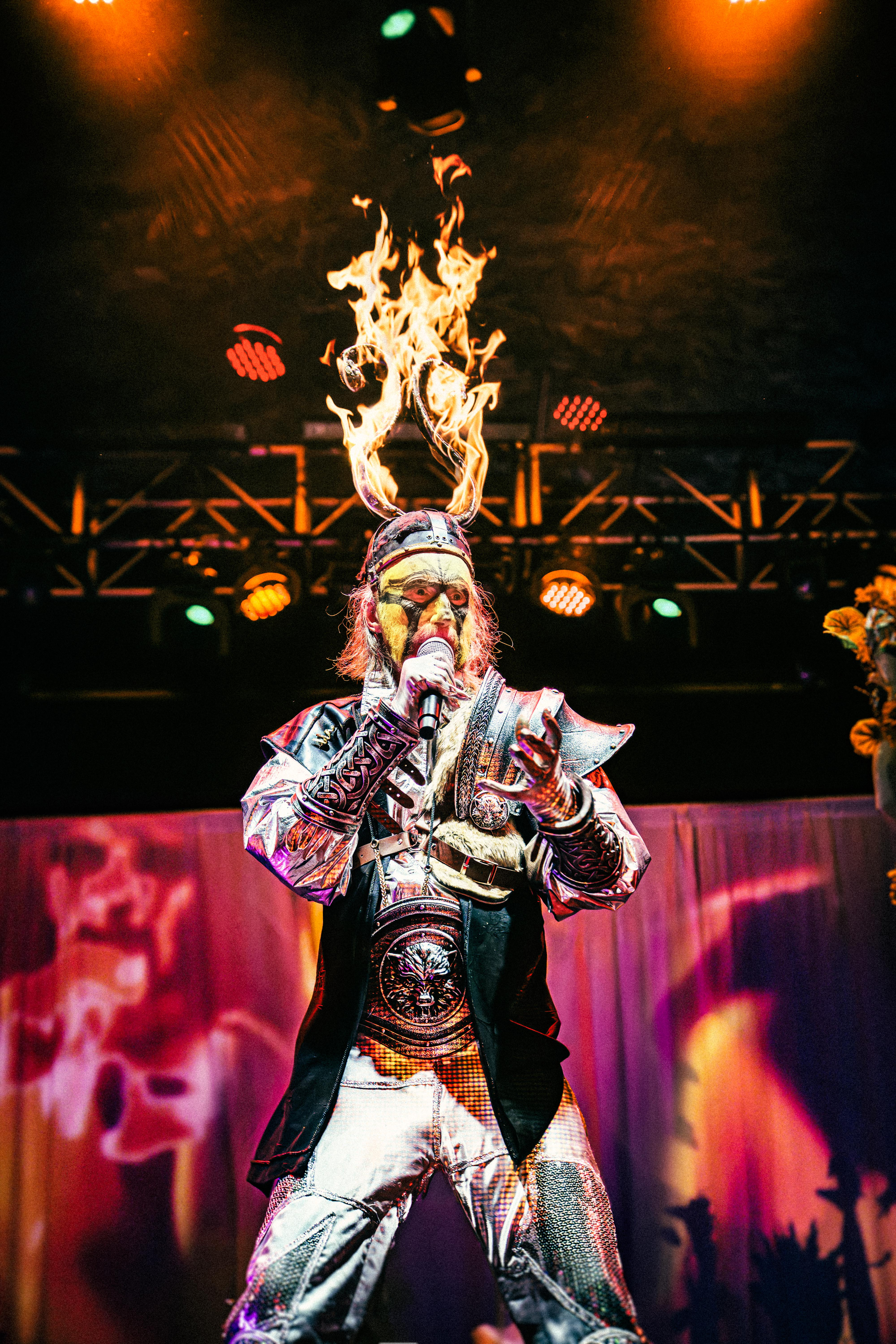
- Arthur Brown in 2025 during his live show with the Crazy World Of Arthur Brown. His signature "Fire helmet" can be seen.

Background information
- Also known as: The God of Hellfire
- Born: Arthur Wilton Brown; 24 June 1942 (age 84); Whitby, North Riding of Yorkshire, England
- Education: University of London
- Genres: Shock rock; progressive rock; proto-metal; psychedelic rock; psychedelic soul
- Occupations: Singer; songwriter; musician
- Instruments: Vocals; drum machine
- Years active: 1965–present
- Labels: Prophecy; Cleopatra; Track; Polydor
- Member of: The Crazy World of Arthur Brown
- Formerly of: The Arthur Brown Set; The Ramong Sound; The Foundations; Kingdom Come

Arthur Wilton Brown (born 24 June 1942) is an English singer and songwriter best known for his flamboyant and theatrical performances, eclectic (and sometimes experimental) work and his powerful, wide-ranging operatic voice, in particular his high pitched banshee screams. He is also notable for his unique stage persona, featuring extreme facepaint, movement, dance, costume changes and a burning helmet.

Brown has been the lead singer of various groups, most notably the Crazy World of Arthur Brown and Kingdom Come, followed by a varied solo career as well as associations with Hawkwind, the Who and Klaus Schulze. In the late 1960s, the Crazy World of Arthur Brown's popularity was such that the group shared bills with the Who, Jimi Hendrix, Frank Zappa's The Mothers of Invention, the Doors, Small Faces and Joe Cocker, among others.

He is best known for the Crazy World of Arthur Brown's 1968 single "Fire", reaching number one in the UK Singles Chart and Canada, and number two on the US Billboard Hot 100 and number three in the German charts, as well as its parent album The Crazy World of Arthur Brown which reached number 2 in the UK, number 6 in Canada, and number 7 in the US. Following the success of the single "Fire", the press would often refer to Brown as "The God of Hellfire", in reference to the opening shouted line of the song, a moniker that exists to this day. Overlooked upon release, Kingdom Come's 1973 album Journey has received generally positive retrospective reviews from critics. Alan Holmes of Freq said that "Journey was so far ahead of its time that you have to keep checking the sleeve to make sure that it really does say 1973 and not 1983" and that the album was "not only Arthur Brown's masterpiece, but also one of the truly great albums of the seventies."

Although Brown has had limited commercial success and has never released another recording as commercially successful as "Fire", he has remained a significant influence on a wide range of musicians in numerous genres because of his operatic vocal style, wild stage persona and often experimental concepts; he is considered to be a pioneer of shock rock and progressive rock and has had an influence on both electronic and heavy metal music. In 2005, Brown won the 'Showman of the Year' award from Classic Rock magazine, receiving the award at the Classic Rock Roll of Honour Awards ceremony held in London's Café de Paris.

== Biography ==
Brown was born in Whitby where his parents ran a guest house. After attending Roundhay Grammar School in Leeds, Yorkshire, Brown attended the University of London and the University of Reading and studied philosophy and law, but he gravitated to music instead, forming his first band, Blues and Brown, while at Reading. After a spell fronting a number of bands in London, Brown then moved to Paris in 1966, where he worked on his theatrical skills. During this period he recorded two songs for the Roger Vadim film The Game Is Over. Returning to London around the turn of 1966 to 1967, he was a temporary member of a London-based R&B/soul/ska group the Ramong Sound that would soon become the hit-making soul group the Foundations.

=== The Crazy World of Arthur Brown ===
By the time the Foundations had been signed to Pye Records, Brown had left the group to form his band, the Crazy World of Arthur Brown. The band included Vincent Crane (Hammond organ and piano), Drachen Theaker (drums), and Nick Greenwood (bass). Brown quickly earned a reputation for outlandish performances, which included the use of a burning metal helmet, that led to occasional mishaps, such as during an early appearance at the Windsor Festival in 1967, where he wore a colander on his head soaked in methanol. The fuel poured over his head by accident caught fire; a bystander doused the flames by pouring beer on Brown's head, preventing any serious injury. The flaming head then became an Arthur Brown signature. On occasion he also stripped naked while performing, most notably at the Palermo Pop 70 Festival in Sicily, Italy, July 1970, where he was arrested and deported. He was also notable for the extreme make-up he wore onstage, which would later be reflected in the stage acts of Alice Cooper and Kiss. He was also famed for his powerful operatic voice and his high pitched screams.

By 1968, the debut album, The Crazy World of Arthur Brown became a hit on both sides of the Atlantic. Produced by the Who's manager Kit Lambert, and executive-produced by Pete Townshend on Track Records, the label begun by Lambert and Chris Stamp, it spun off an equally surprising hit single, "Fire", and contained a version of "I Put a Spell on You" by Screamin' Jay Hawkins, a similarly bizarre showman. "Fire" sold over one million copies, and was awarded a gold disc. The song has since seen its opening line "I am the God of Hellfire" sampled in numerous other places, most notably in the Prodigy's 1992 rave anthem "Fire". The band recorded a second album, titled Strangelands, intended for release in 1969 but shelved by their label over concerns that it lacked sales potential. The album featured a more experimental and avant-garde sound that shed the pop sensibilities of the Crazy World's debut. Strangelands was not issued until 1988. Theaker was replaced because of his aviophobia in 1968 by drummer Carl Palmer, later of Atomic Rooster and Emerson, Lake & Palmer, for the band's second American tour in 1969, on which keyboardist Vincent Crane also left – although he soon returned. However, Crane and Palmer eventually left in June 1969 to form Atomic Rooster, spelling the end for the Crazy World of Arthur Brown.

=== Arthur Brown's Kingdom Come ===
Though Brown never released another recording as commercially successful as "Fire", he worked with a varied group of musicians on projects called Strangelands, Puddletown Express, and (briefly) the Captain Beefheart-influenced Rustic Hinge, before releasing three albums with his new band Kingdom Come in the early 1970s. (Note: Arthur Brown's Kingdom Come has no link with the American/German hard-rock/glam band of the same name.)

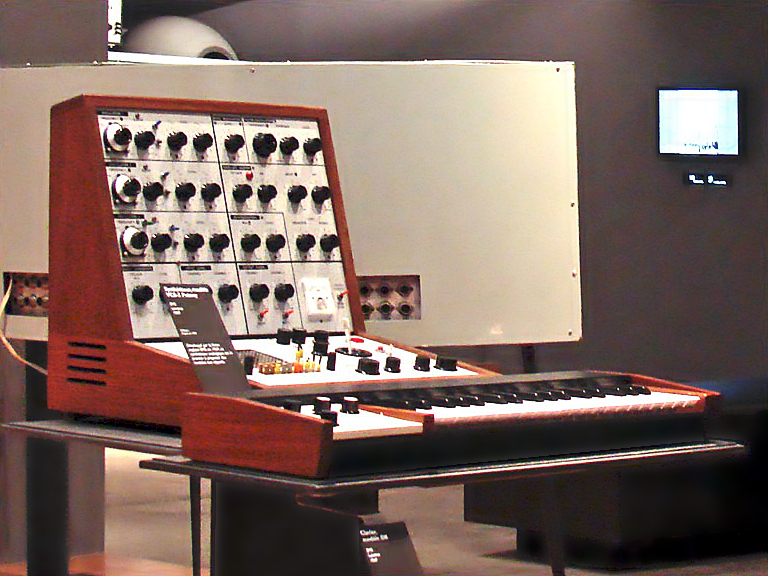
Victor Peraino used the EMS VCS 3 synthesizer on the album Journey.

The three Kingdom Come albums each have a distinctive character. The first, Galactic Zoo Dossier, was a highly complex concept album apparently on the theme of humanity living in a zoo and being controlled by cosmic, religious and commercial forces. The second, simply titled Kingdom Come, was loosely on the theme of water, which Brown had declared four years earlier would be the subject of the second album by the Crazy World. It was musically more conventional than the first, much less heavy, though stranger in places. The third album, Journey (1973), recorded in Rockfield Studios in Wales, was a space rock album, with Brown playing an early drum machine and thereby replacing a series of drummers. The band also recorded three of its songs in a live Peel Session for the John Peel BBC Radio 1 show on 25 September 1972. Richie Unterberger of Allmusic said that the album has been "most noted in retrospect as one of the first rock records to use a drum machine, which was still quite a novelty back in 1973." This was especially noteworthy on the track "Time Captives". Brown recalled "the whole album is based around the drum machine, and we had a lot of ideas that we wanted to explore using this technology. The drum machine they used was the Bentley Rhythm Ace, the British version of the Ace Tone Rhythm Ace FR-1.

Overlooked upon release, Journey has received generally positive retrospective reviews from critics. Alan Holmes of Freq said that "Journey was so far ahead of its time that you have to keep checking the sleeve to make sure that it really does say 1973 and not 1983" and that the album was "not only Arthur Brown's masterpiece, but also one of the truly great albums of the seventies."

The stage acts for all three albums featured a wild mix of special effects, dramatic costumes and colourful theatrics, which were sometimes controversial. Brown had declared when Kingdom Come was formed that the intention was to create a multi-media experience and the band always followed that policy. The concepts, the music and the theatrics proved very popular on the university circuit but proved too way-out for a mainstream audience. The band appeared at the 1971 Glastonbury Festival in Somerset, England and featured in the Glastonbury Fayre film which was shown in cinemas.

=== Later career ===
In later years, Brown released several solo albums. In 1973, he was one of the performers on Robert Calvert's album Captain Lockheed and the Starfighters, together with a number of other Hawkwind members. In 1975, he appeared in the Who's rock opera movie Tommy as "The Priest". Later that year he contributed vocals to the song "The Tell-Tale Heart" on the Poe-based concept album Tales of Mystery and Imagination by the Alan Parsons Project. In 1979 and 1980, he collaborated with German electronic musician Klaus Schulze, and can be heard on the albums Dune, ...Live... and Time Actor. Also, In 1979 he moved to Africa and lived there for six months. He directed the Burundi National Orchestra, a nine-piece rock group that played Jimi Hendrix songs and local music.

In the 1980s, Brown moved to Austin, Texas, where his wife came from, and obtained a master's degree in counselling. On 17 January 1987, Brown performed "Fire" on the "Flashback" segment of the television programme Solid Gold. Together with former Mothers of Invention drummer Jimmy Carl Black, he also became a painter and carpenter for some years, and released an album with him, Brown, Black & Blue (1988). In 1992, Brown and fellow counsellor Jim Maxwell founded Healing Songs Therapy, a service that culminated in Brown creating a song for each client about their emotional issues.

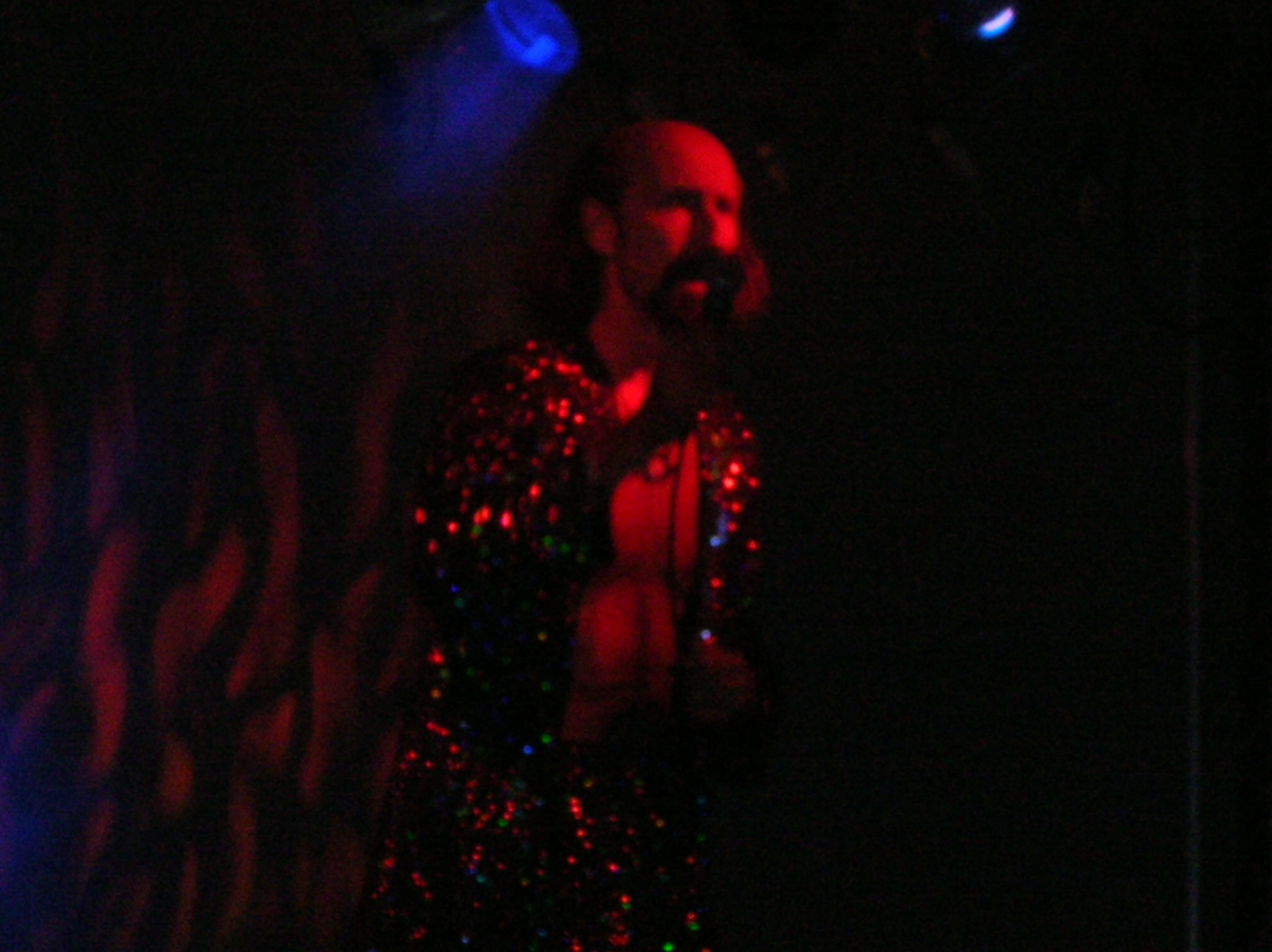
Arthur Brown playing at the Wickerman Festival, 2005

Brown returned to England in 1996. In 1997, he re-recorded "Fire" with German band Die Krupps, while in 1998, he provided a spoken-word performance on Bruce Dickinson's The Chemical Wedding album, reading a portion of three poems by William Blake, and appeared as Satan in Dickinson's music video for "Killing Floor". He was narrator for the Pretty Things' live performance of their album S. F. Sorrow (1998) at Abbey Road Studios. He also appeared on television, guesting on Kula Shaker track "Mystical Machine Gun" several times during 1999.

A further change of musical direction occurred, when he formed an acoustic band and went on tour with Tim Rose in 1999. This band then added Stan Adler (cello and bass) and Malcolm Mortimore (percussion) and produced the album Tantric Lover (2000). However, the lineup did not last, and Brown put a new band together with guitarist Rikki Patten and multi-instrumentalist Nick Pynn. In 2002, Brown was asked to support Robert Plant on his Dreamland Tour. By now Patten had been replaced by guitarist Chris Bryant. Brown was getting some more media exposure now. His band was briefly called the Giant Pocket Orchestra, and also Instant Flight. In the middle of this, in 2003, Brown released Vampire Suite (2003), an album with Josh Philips and Mark Brzezicki of the band Big Country, released on Ian Grant's Track Records. Also around this time, Brown's back catalogue was re-released by Sanctuary Records.

In 2001 and 2002, Brown made several guest appearances at live Hawkwind concerts, subsequently touring with them as a guest vocalist. On their December 2002 tour, Hawkwind played several songs by Brown from the Kingdom Come era, along with "Song of the Gremlin", which Brown had sung on Captain Lockheed and the Starfighters; this was documented on the Hawkwind DVD Out of the Shadows.

Brown also provided vocals on two of the tracks on Hawkwind's studio album Take Me to Your Leader, released in 2005. One is the spoken-word "A Letter to Robert", where Brown recalls a conversation with Robert Calvert. Brown continued his association with Hawkwind, touring with a support set for them on their 40th anniversary tour in the United Kingdom in 2009.

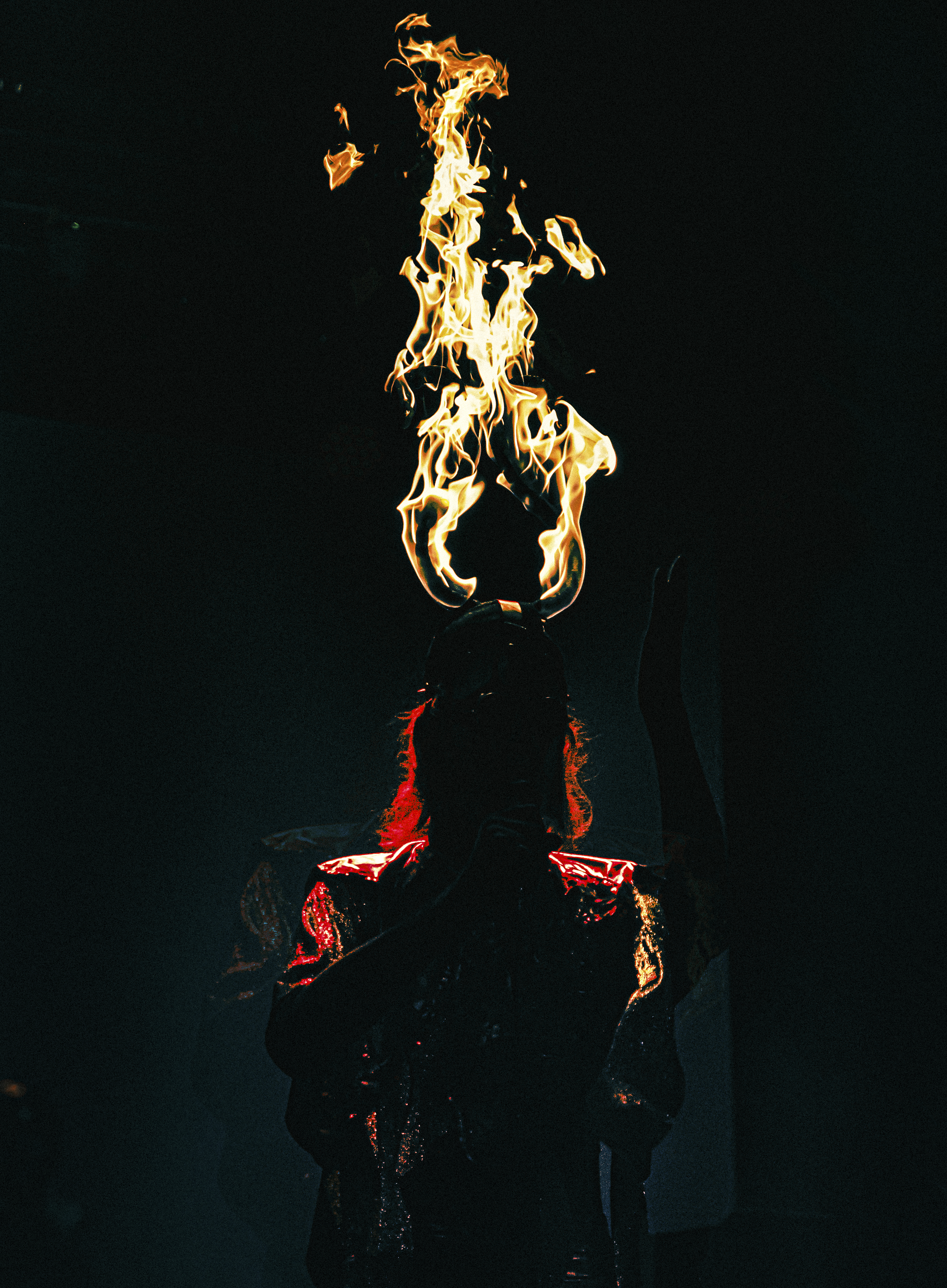
Brown in 2022 during his live show with the Crazy World Of Arthur Brown

Brown reunited the surviving members of Kingdom Come (except Des Fisher) in 2005, for a one-off concert at the Astoria in London, performing material from Kingdom Come's album Galactic Zoo Dossier, with an encore of "Spirit of Joy". This show won Brown the 'Showman of the Year' award from Classic Rock magazine, with Brown receiving the award at the Classic Rock Roll of Honour Awards ceremony held in London's Café de Paris. In 2007, Brown and Pynn released Voice of Love on the Côte Basque record label, featuring a number of original recordings.

In August 2007, during a concert in Lewes, East Sussex, England, Brown once again set fire to his hair. While trying to extinguish the flames, Phil Rhodes, a member of the band also caught fire. Brown carried on after the fire was put out; he had however lost a few chunks of hair. He appeared as a priest in the video for the Darkness song, "Is It Just Me?". In 2009, a roll-out re-release of Brown's back catalogue was commenced by Cherry Red Records' subsidiary Lemon Recordings and continued from 2010 onwards on their sister label Esoteric Recordings.

In 2010, Brown played a set at the Glastonbury Festival in the Glade. On 10 June 2011, days before his 69th birthday, he played at the Ray Davies Meltdown Festival at the Queen Elizabeth Hall, London where he invited Z-Star to duet with him. Six weeks later, again in London, he played the High Voltage Festival; the gig was recorded and released (on vinyl only) as The Crazy World of Arthur Brown Live at High Voltage. In 2012, Brown and Rick Patten released The Magic Hat alongside a comic of the same title by Matt Howarth. In 2013, as the result of a successful pledge campaign on PledgeMusic, Brown released the album Zim Zam Zim. In 2018, Brown was a guest vocalist on the first five dates of Hawkwind's UK tour.

In April 2019, it was announced that Brown would join Carl Palmer's ELP Legacy as guest vocalist on "The Royal Affair Tour", starting in June 2019. ELP Legacy's sets on this tour included Brown providing vocals on his signature song "Fire", as well as on the Emerson, Lake & Palmer songs "Knife-Edge" and "Karn Evil 9: 1st Impression, Part 2."

In 2019, Brown has received the "Visionary Artist Award" at the annual Progressive Music Awards.

On 29 March 2022 it was announced that the new Arthur Brown album, titled Long Long Road, would be released on his 80th birthday, 24 June 2022.

== Musical style and influence ==
Almost 50 years ago, musical icon Arthur Brown stepped out on stage, five-foot tall flames leaping from his head, and uttered one of rock music's most stirring lines: "I am the God of Hellfire". At that point, the British theatrical rocker who brought us the Crazy World of Arthur Brown in '68 had no way of knowing that he would come to be seen as a major pioneer in not only progressive rock and heavy metal, but the entire concept of what makes a stage show. He's influenced generations of musicians who searched for an edge, from King Diamond, Kiss, and Peter Gabriel to Marilyn Manson, Rob Halford, and Alice Cooper.

— "The God of Hellfire Speaks: 73 Years Inside the Crazy World of Arthur Brown", Vice magazine, 2013.

Brown's music encompasses psychedelic soul, soul, blues, British rhythm and blues, pop, acid rock, psychedelia, psychedelic rock, progressive rock, shock rock and experimental music.

Though Brown has had limited commercial success and has never released another recording as commercially successful as "Fire", he has been a significant influence on Alice Cooper, David Bowie, Diamanda Galás, Peter Gabriel, Marilyn Manson, George Clinton, Kiss, King Diamond, and Bruce Dickinson of Iron Maiden, among others, and his songs have been covered or sampled by a range of artists including Ozzy Osbourne, Psychic TV, the Prodigy, Marilyn Manson, the Who and Death Grips.

Brown's voice and in particular his high banshee screams, are a precursor to the banshee screaming of many later heavy metal singers, and his theatrical concepts and stage presence such as the face makeup, especially his black and white face paint (corpse paint), voodoo dancing, and flaming helmet pioneered a lot of what was to become shock rock and progressive rock. Alice Cooper stated, "Can you imagine the young Alice Cooper watching that with all his make-up and hellish performance? It was like all my Halloweens came at once!" Deep Purple singer Ian Gillan has said he was inspired by Brown to incorporate screaming into his singing style, stating "He changed my life".

Mike Knoop, writing for Classic Rock magazine, said that Brown's singing style recalls "Eric Burdon, Bob Calvert, Ian Gillan, Tim Curry, Brian Connolly, and a smidgen of King Diamond all coming out of one person." Brian Carr, another Classic Rock writer, compared the debut album's music to that of Alice Cooper and Frank Zappa.

The third and final Kingdom Come album, Journey (1973), is noteworthy for being one of the first rock albums to feature a drum machine, especially on the track "Time Captives".

== Selected discography ==
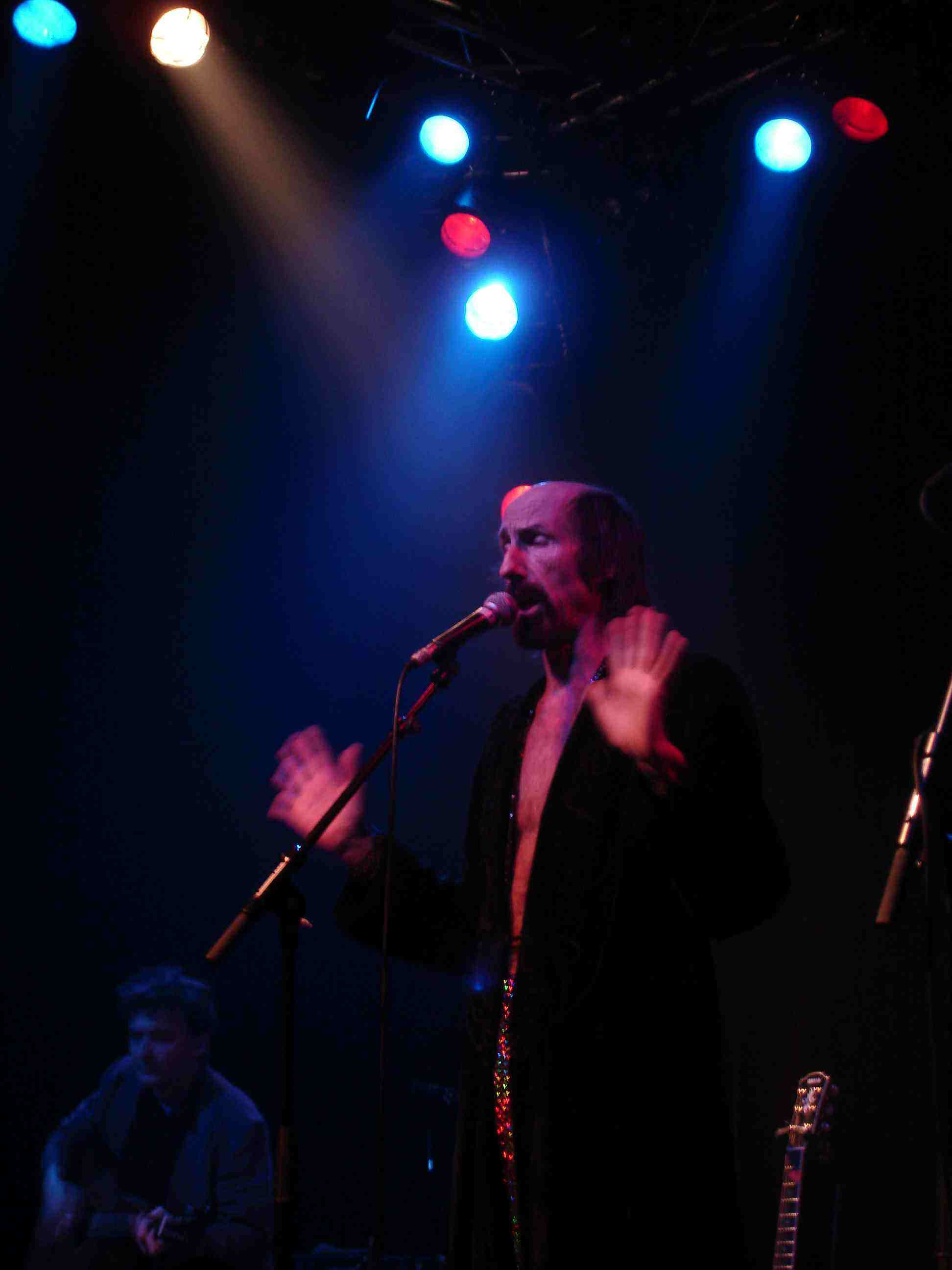
Brown on stage, 2009

=== Studio albums ===
Solo

- 1975 – Dance
- 1977 – Chisholm in My Bosom
- 1982 – Speaknotech (also known as Speak No Tech in following re-releases)
- 1982 – Requiem
- 2022 – Long Long Road
- 2022 – Monster's Ball
- 2026 – Nature

With the Crazy World of Arthur Brown

- 1968 – The Crazy World of Arthur Brown
- 1988 – Strangelands (recorded in 1969)
- 2000 – Tantric Lover
- 2003 – Vampire Suite
- 2013 – Zim Zam Zim (released on 8 November 2013, as the result of a successful pledge campaign)
- 2019 – Gypsy Voodoo

With Kingdom Come

- 1971 – Galactic Zoo Dossier
- 1972 – Kingdom Come
- 1973 – Journey

Other collaborations

- 1979 – Faster Than the Speed of Light (with Vincent Crane)
- 1988 – Brown, Black & Blue (with Jimmy Carl Black)
- 2007 – The Voice of Love (by the Amazing World of Arthur Brown)
- 2012 – The Magic Hat (with Rick Patten; limited edition of 200; an accompanying comic of The Magic Hat by Matt Howarth is also available)

=== Live albums ===
- 1993 – Order From Chaos (by the Crazy World of Arthur Brown)
- 1994 – Jam (recorded in 1970) (by Kingdom Come)
- 2002 – The Legboot Album – Arthur Brown on Tour
- 2011 – The Crazy World of Arthur Brown Live at High Voltage (vinyl only release, limited edition of 1000)

=== Compilation albums ===
- 1976 – Lost Ears (by Kingdom Come)
- 2003 – Fire – The Story of Arthur Brown

=== Singles ===
- 1965 – "You'll Be Mine" (The Diamonds) b/w "You Don't Know" (Arthur Brown with the Diamonds) (Reading Rag Record LYN 770/771 UK)
- 1967 – "Devil's Grip" b/w "Give Him a Flower" (The Crazy World of Arthur Brown) (Track Records 604008 UK)
- 1968 – "Fire" b/w "Rest Cure" (The Crazy World of Arthur Brown) (Track 604022 UK), (Atlantic Records 2556 US), (Polydor 541012 Can)
- 1968 – "Nightmare" b/w "Music Man" (aka "What's Happening") (The Crazy World of Arthur Brown) (Track 604026 UK)(Polydor 541022 Can / #68 Canada)
- 1968 – "I Put a Spell on You" b/w "Nightmare" (The Crazy World of Arthur Brown) (Track 2582 US)
- 1971 – "Eternal Messenger" b/w "I.D. Side to be B Side the C Side" (Kingdom Come) (Polydor Records 2001 234 UK)
- 1973 – "Spirit of Joy" b/w "Come Alive" (Polydor 2001 416 UK)
- 1974 – "Gypsies" b/w "Dance" (Gull Records GULS 4 UK)
- 1975 – "We've Gotta Get Out of This Place" b/w "Here I Am" (Gull GULS 13 UK)
- 1976 – "Ooh, It Takes Two to Tango " b/w "Rocking the Boat" (Arthur Brown & Aliki Ashman) (Electric INT 111.352 GER)

=== Soundtrack contributions ===
- 1966 – The Game Is Over (two songs)
- 1975 – Tommy

=== Other contributions ===
- 1974 – Captain Lockheed and the Starfighters (Robert Calvert)
- 1976 – Tales of Mystery and Imagination (the Alan Parsons Project)
- 1979 – Dune (Klaus Schulze)
- 1979 – Time Actor (Richard Wahnfried)
- 1980 – ...Live... (Klaus Schulze)
- 1994 – Vicar (Green Machine)
- 1994 – Sonic Lobotomy (Green Machine)
- 1998 – The Chemical Wedding (Bruce Dickinson)
- 1999 – Resurrection (The Pretty Things)
- 2000 – Curly's Airships (Judge Smith)
- 2007 – Fifteen Years After (All Living Fear)
- 2013 – Friends for a Livetime (the Hamburg Blues Band)
- 2014 – Journey in Time (Victor Peraino's Kingdom Come)

== Selected filmography ==
- 1968 – The Committee
- 1973 – Superstars in Concert also known as Sound of the City: London 1964-1973
- 1975 – Tommy

== Bibliography ==
Marshall, Polly. The God of Hellfire, the Crazy Life and Times of Arthur Brown. SAF Publishing, 2005. ISBN 0-946719-77-2.
