= The Crazy World of Arthur Brown =

English rock band

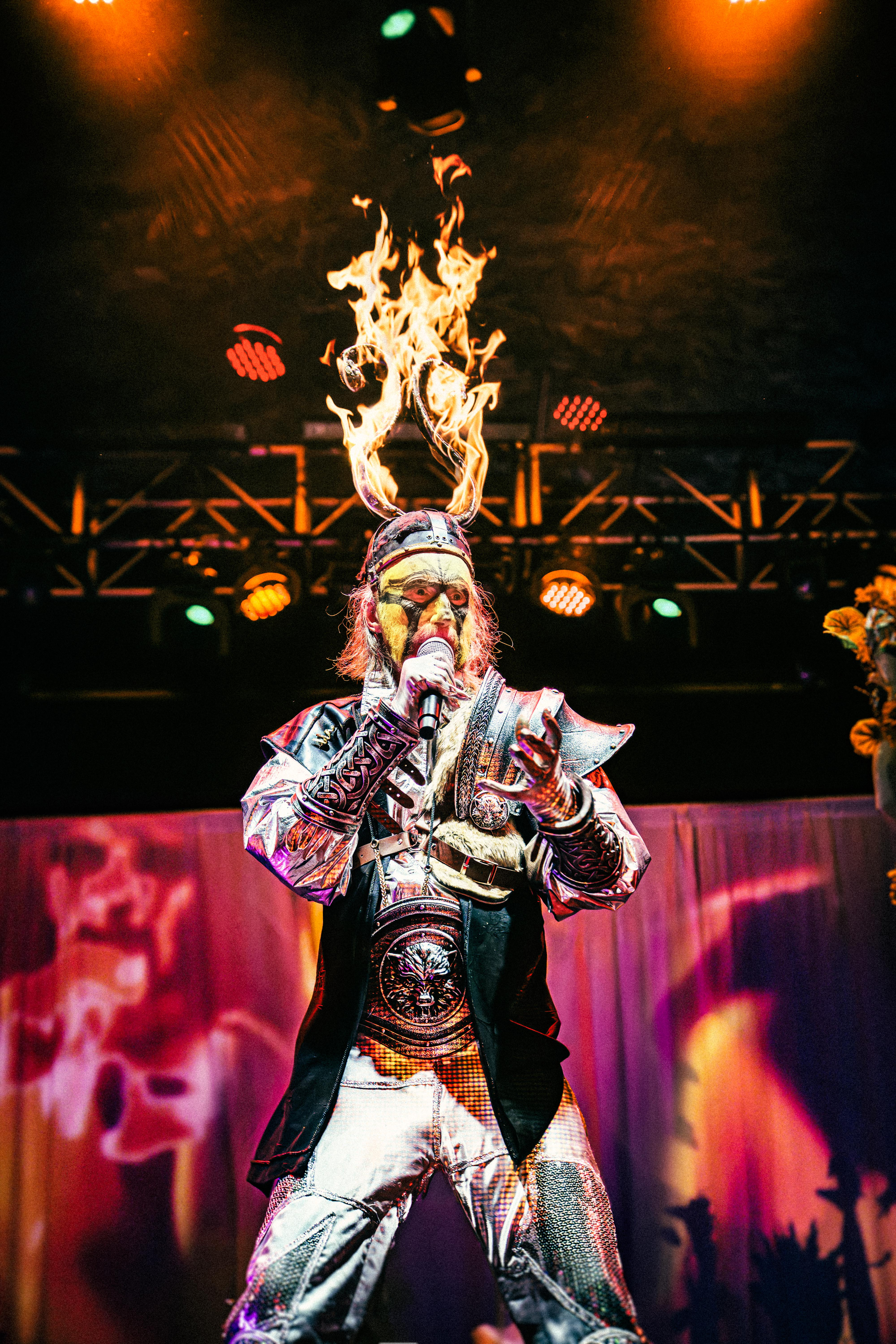
- The Crazy World Of Arthur Brown live in 2025. Arthur Brown can be seen wearing his signature "Fire helmet".

Background information
- Origin: London, England
- Genres: Rock; R&B; psychedelia; soul
- Years active: 1967–present
- Labels: Cherry Red; Atlantic; Voiceprint; Track; Zoho Roots
- Spinoffs: Atomic Rooster; Kingdom Come
- Members: Arthur Brown; Claire Waller; Jim Mortimore; Samuel Walker; Dan Smith
- Past members: Vincent Crane; Sean Nicholas Greenwood; Drachen Theaker; Carl Palmer; Jeff Cutler; Dick Heninghem; Pete Solley
- Website: www.thegodofhellfire.com

The Crazy World of Arthur Brown are an English rock band formed by singer Arthur Brown in 1967. The original band included Vincent Crane (Hammond organ and piano), Drachen Theaker (drums), and Nick Greenwood (bass). This early incarnation were noted for Crane's organ and brass arrangements and Brown's powerful, wide-ranging operatic voice. Brown is notable for his unique stage persona, featuring extreme facepaint, movement, dance, costume changes and a burning helmet.

Their song "Fire" (released in 1968 as a single) sold more than one million copies, and was awarded a gold disc reaching number one in the UK Singles Chart and Canada, and number two on the US Billboard Hot 100 as well as its parent album The Crazy World of Arthur Brown which reached number 2 on the UK album charts, number 6 in Canada, and number 7 in the US. Following the success of "Fire", the press would often refer to Brown as "The God of Hellfire", in reference to the opening shouted line of the song, a moniker that exists to this day.

In the late 1960s, the Crazy World of Arthur Brown's popularity was such that the group shared bills with the Who, Jimi Hendrix, the Mothers of Invention, the Doors, the Small Faces, and Joe Cocker, among others. However, the band's second studio album, Strangelands, although set to be released in 1969, was shelved by the band's record label due to lacking sales potential (although it would later be released in 1988). The band broke up in 1970, with Crane and fellow member Carl Palmer forming Atomic Rooster, Theaker joining the band Love, and Brown joining the group Kingdom Come. Palmer would later co-found Emerson, Lake & Palmer and Asia. Since then, the lineup has seen several changes.

There were further studio and live releases in 1970, 1993 (live album), 2000, 2003, 2011 (live album), 2013 and 2019.

As of 2025 the lineup consists of Brown, Jim Mortimore, Sam Walker, and Dan Smith.

Although the band only had one major hit, they would be incredibly influential in innovating the shock rock genre and the freak scene aesthetic. Numerous shock rock artists, such as Kiss, Alice Cooper and Marilyn Manson, alongside other musicians like David Bowie and Peter Gabriel (of Genesis), would be heavily influenced by the group, and Brown would take part in numerous notable projects, including playing a character in the film adaptation of The Who's Tommy.

== History ==
=== 1967–1968: Beginnings and initial success ===
Before Arthur Brown started the group, he was a member of numerous bands, including his first, Blues and Brown, from 1965 to 1966. In 1966, he would join The Ramong Sound, who would later change their name to The Foundations. The Foundations would later become successful with songs such as "Baby, Now That I've Found You" and "Build Me Up Buttercup". However, by then, Arthur had left the group to form his own. The Crazy World of Arthur Brown was formed in 1967, with Brown as the lead vocalist, Sean Nicholas Greenwood as the bassist, Vincent Crane as the pianist and organist, and Drachen Theaker as the drummer.

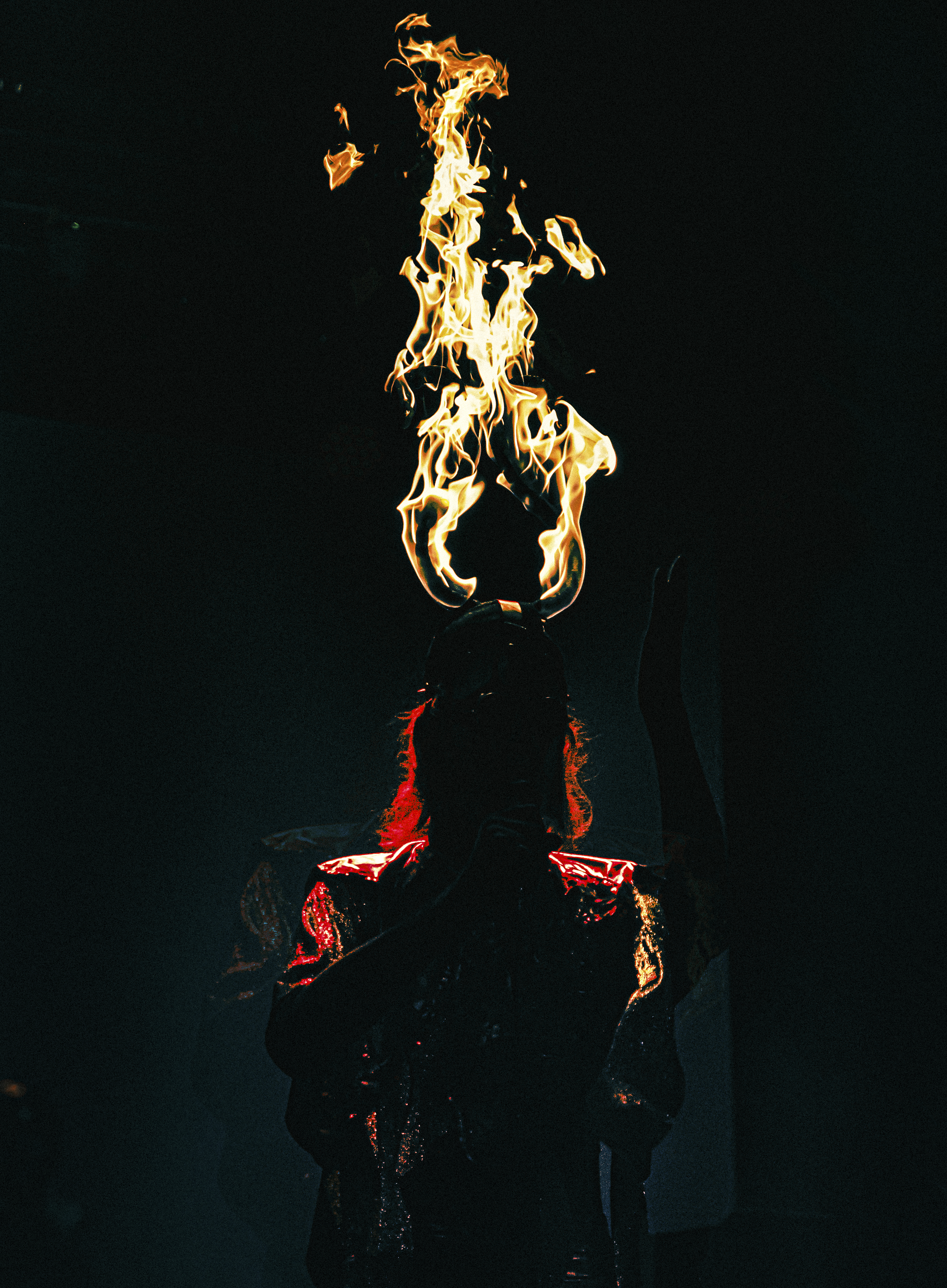
Arthur Brown performing live in 2022; his head can be seen lit on fire

Brown quickly earned a reputation for both his powerful, operatic voice (spanning over 4 octaves), and his outlandish performances, including the use of a burning metal helmet, which led to occasional mishaps. During an early appearance at the Windsor Festival in 1967, Brown wore a colander on his head soaked in methanol. The fuel poured over his head by accident caught fire; two bystanders doused the flames by pouring beer on Brown's head, preventing any serious injury. The flaming head then became an Arthur Brown signature. On occasion he also stripped naked while performing, most notably in Italy, where, after setting his hair on fire, he was arrested and deported. He was also notable for the extreme make-up he wore onstage, which would later be reflected in the stage acts of Alice Cooper, Peter Gabriel, George Clinton, and Bruce Dickinson among others.

In 1967, the band would release their debut single, "Devil's Grip" (backed with "Give Him a Flower"), which was not a success. A year later, in 1968, the band would release their second single and the lead single to their upcoming debut record, "Fire". Unlike "Devil's Grip", "Fire" would become a huge worldwide hit, making it to the top of the UK singles chart and the Canadian singles chart, and making it to number 2 on the Billboard Hot 100, blocked from the number 1 spot by The Beatles' "Hey Jude". The song was also a top-10 hit in Belgium, Switzerland, Germany, The Netherlands, and Australia. The song would also sell one million copies, making the single a gold record.

Soon after, in June 1968, the band would release their self-titled debut studio album. The album hit number two of the UK Albums chart, number 6 on the Billboard Canadian Albums chart, and number 7 on Billboard's Pop Albums chart. However, the next two singles from the album, the original composition "Nightmare" and the Screamin' Jay Hawkins-penned "I Put a Spell on You", would be less successful than "Fire", with "Nightmare" charting at number 56 on the UK singles chart and number 107 on the Billboard Hot 100, and "I Put a Spell on You" only charting at number 111 on the Billboard Hot 100.

Theaker was replaced (because of his aviophobia) in 1968 by Chris Farlowe & The Thunderbirds drummer Carl Palmer (later of Atomic Rooster, Emerson, Lake & Palmer and Asia) for the band's second American tour in 1969, on which keyboardist Vincent Crane also left—although he soon returned. Theaker would go on to join Love and then Rustic Hinge.

=== 1969–present ===
After the success of their debut, the band recorded their second studio album, titled Strangelands. The album was intended for release in 1969, but it was shelved by their label over concerns that it lacked sales potential. The album featured a more experimental and avant-garde sound that shed the pop sensibilities of the Crazy World's debut. Strangelands was eventually issued in 1988, although this was 19 years after the album was supposed to release.

The new lineup in 1969 (which by then included Brown, Greenwood, Crane, and Palmer) practically dissolved on the band's US tour in June 1969. Crane and Palmer left to form Atomic Rooster, Greenwood, known as Sean Nicholas during his time in the band, went on to Khan where he performed under the name Nick Greenwood. Jeff Cutler, Dick Heninghem, and Pete Solley would take their places, although Dick Heninghem left the same year he joined, and the band would break up in 1970. The band released the album Strangelands in 1970 and a live album "Order From Chaos" in 1993. Arthur Brown eventually formed Arthur Brown's Kingdom Come in 1970.

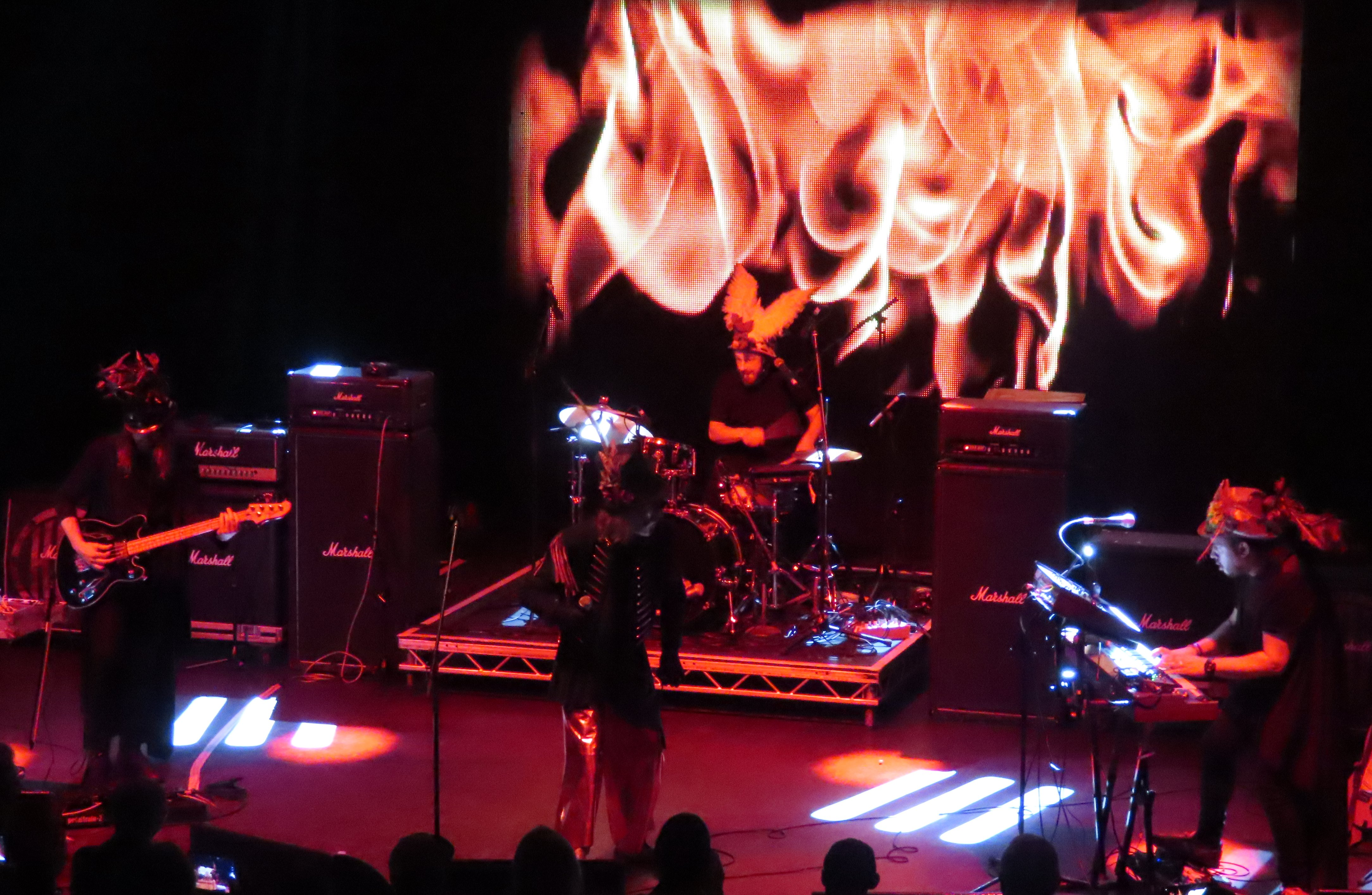
The Crazy World of Arthur Brown performing at Shepherd's Bush Empire on the 5th of September, 2021.

In 2000 they released their third studio album Tantric Lover on which Arthur Brown, Malcolm Mortimore, Stan Adler and Rik Patten can be heard. Three years later, in 2003, the band would release their fourth studio album, Vampire Suite which was recorded with Arthur Brown, Mark Brzezicki and Josh Phillips. In 2011, the band would release their second live album, The Crazy World of Arthur Brown Live at High Voltage, a follow up to Order From Chaos. In 2013, as the result of a successful pledge campaign on PledgeMusic, the band released their fifth studio album, Zim Zam Zim in collaboration with Jim Mortimore and Sam Walker. The band's most recent studio effort, Gypsy Voodoo (In collaboration with Mike Morgan), was released in 2019.

Under the continued leadership of Arthur Brown, the band remains active as a touring and recording act. Since 2019, Brown has worked in creative partnership with '''Claire Waller''', who serves as the band’s Creative Director. Together they have developed a new form of ''The Crazy World of Arthur Brown''—a multimedia stage show that integrates lighting, costumes, movement and visual design to reflect Brown’s enduring fusion of music, theatre, and performance art.

The current band lineup is Arthur Brown, Jim Mortimore, Sam Walker and Dan Smith.

== Musical style ==
The Crazy World of Arthur Brown's music encompasses psychedelic rock, soul, rhythm and blues, pop, and theatrical performance.

Their live performances - with dramatic costuming and pyrotechnics - helped form the basis of the "shock rock" aesthetic and influenced artists such as Alice Cooper, Peter Gabriel and David Bowie.

Mike Knoop, writing for Classic Rock magazine, said that Brown's singing style recalls "Eric Burdon, Bob Calvert, Ian Gillan, Tim Curry, Brian Connolly, and a smidgen of King Diamond all coming out of one person." Brian Carr, another Classic Rock writer, compared the debut album's music to that of Alice Cooper and Frank Zappa.

== Members ==
=== Current members ===
- Arthur Brown – lead vocals (1967–present)
- Jim Mortimore – bass, backing vocals, guitars, electronics
- Samuel Walker – drums, backing vocals, percussion
- Dan Smith (of Noisettes) – guitars, Hammond organ, electronics, vocals
- Claire Waller – creative director, costume, production

=== Former members ===
- Sean Nicholas Greenwood – bass guitar (1967–1970)
- Vincent Crane – Hammond organ, piano (1967–1969; died 1989)
- Drachen Theaker – drums (1967–1968; died 1992)
- Carl Palmer – drums (1968–1969)
- Jeff Cutler – drums (1969–1970)
- Dick Heninghem – organ, piano (1969)
- Pete Solley – organ, piano (1969–1970; died 2023)

== Discography ==
=== Studio albums ===
- The Crazy World of Arthur Brown (1968)
- Strangelands (1988) (recorded in 1969)
- Tantric Lover (2000)
- Vampire Suite (2003)
- Zim Zam Zim (2013)
- Gypsy Voodoo (In collaboration with Mike Morgan) (2019)
- Nature (with Dan Smith) (2026)

=== Live albums ===
- Order From Chaos (1993)
- The Crazy World of Arthur Brown Live At High Voltage (2011)

=== Singles ===
Year	Song	Peak chart positions								Release
Year	Song	UK	US	BEL	SWI	GER	NETH	AUS	CAN	Release
1967	"Devil's Grip" b/w "Give Him a Flower"	—	—	—	—	—	—	—	—	Track 604008 UK
1968	"Fire" b/w "Rest Cure"	1	2	3	3	3	4	7	1	Track 604022 UK; Atlantic 2556 US; Polydor 541.012 Can
1968	"Nightmare" b/w "Music Man" (aka "What's Happening")	56	107	—	—	—	—	—	68	Track 604026 UK; Polydor 541.022 Can
1968	"I Put a Spell on You" b/w "Nightmare"	—	111	—	—	—	—	—	—	Track 2582 US

=== Music videos ===
Year	Song	Director
2016	"The Formless Depths"	John Byron Hanby IV
