= Lisa Gerrard discography =

This is the discography for Australian musician Lisa Gerrard.

== Microfilm ==
- Microfilm: Centerfold ("Centerfold" and "Window") (1980) Vinyl, 7-inch, Single.
- Microfilm: Compilation entitled "From Belgrave with Love" ("Mossaic" by Liza Gerrard and "Summer House" by Microfilm) (1981) 12-inch, LP.

== Career after Dead Can Dance ==
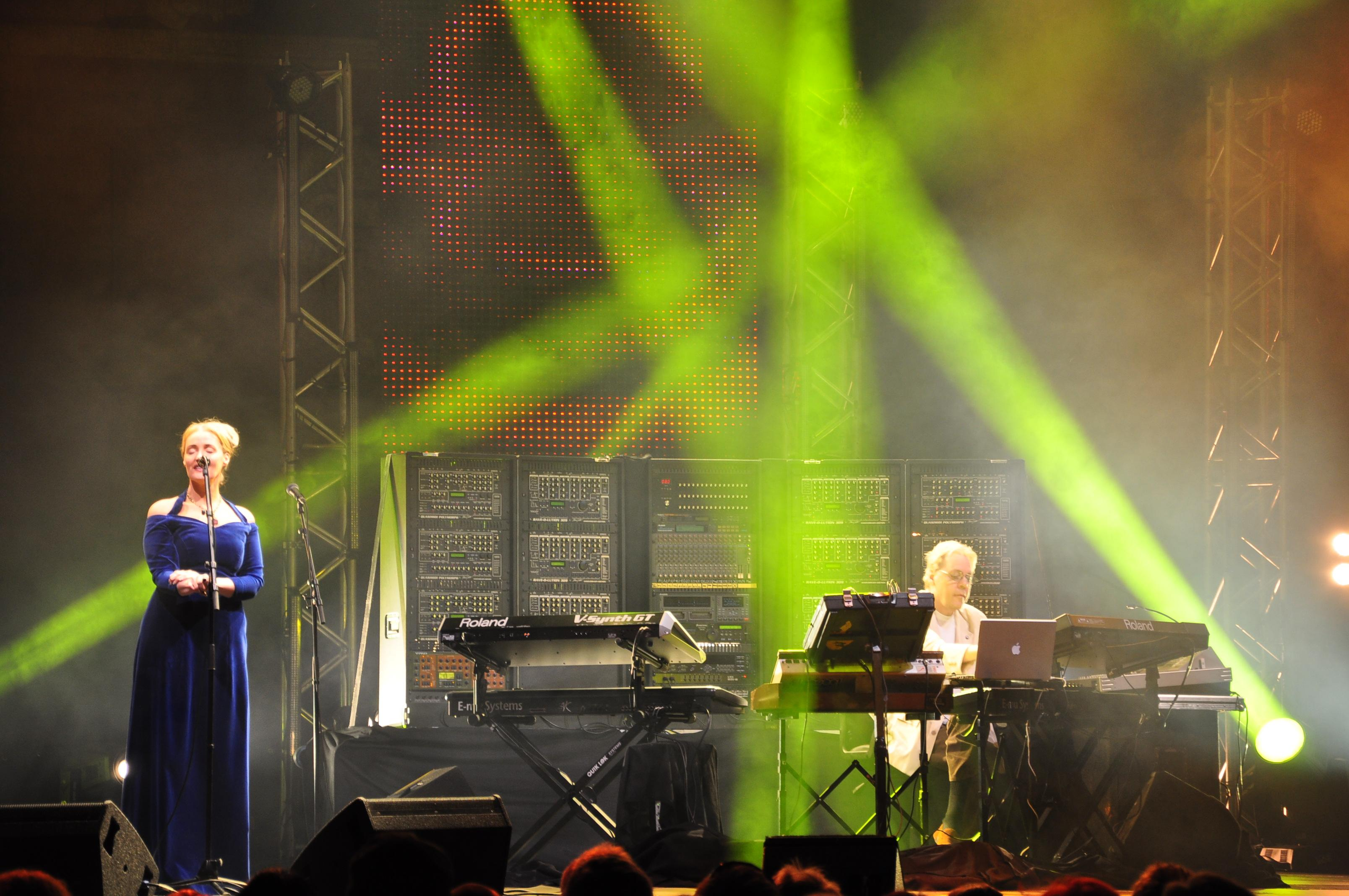
Lisa Gerrard with Klaus Schulze 2009.

- Solo Albums
  - The Mirror Pool (1995)
  - The Silver Tree (2006), release on iTunes and by Rubber Records and re-released in 2010 by Gerrard Records
  - The Best of Lisa Gerrard (2007)
  - The Black Opal (2009) released by Gerrard Records
  - Twilight Kingdom (2014) released by Gerrard Records
- Singles
  - "Deux Titres "Live"" (1994)
  - "Sanvean" (1995)
  - "The Human Game" (with Pieter Bourke, 1998)
  - "Abwoon" (with Patrick Cassidy, 2003)
  - "Hommage A Polska. 17 września" (with Klaus Schulze, 2009)
  - Coming Home (2010) released by Gerrard Records
  - Entry (2010) released by Gerrard Records
  - Come This Way (2010) released by Gerrard Records
  - Seven Seas (2014) released by Gerrard Records
- Collaboration albums
  - Duality (1998), with Pieter Bourke
  - Immortal Memory (2004), with Patrick Cassidy
  - Ashes and Snow (2006) with Patrick Cassidy
  - Farscape (2008) with Klaus Schulze
  - Rheingold (2008) with Klaus Schulze
  - Dziękuję Bardzo (2009) with Klaus Schulze
  - "Come Quietly" (2009) with Klaus Schulze
  - Departum (2010) with Marcello De Francisci
  - The Trail of Genghis Khan (2010) with Cye Wood
  - Big in Europe (2013–14) with Klaus Schulze
  - The Sum of Its Parts (2015) with Chicane
  - Wyld's Call, Armello OST from Armello (2015) with Michael Allen
  - Hiraeth (2018) with David Kuckhermann
  - BooCheeMish (2018) with The Mystery Of The Bulgarian Voices
  - Melodies Of My Youth (2019) with Zbigniew Preisner and Dominik Wania
  - Symphony No. 3: Symphony Of Sorrowful Songs (2020) with Yordan Kamdzhalov and The Genesis Orchestra
  - Burn (2021) with Jules Maxwell

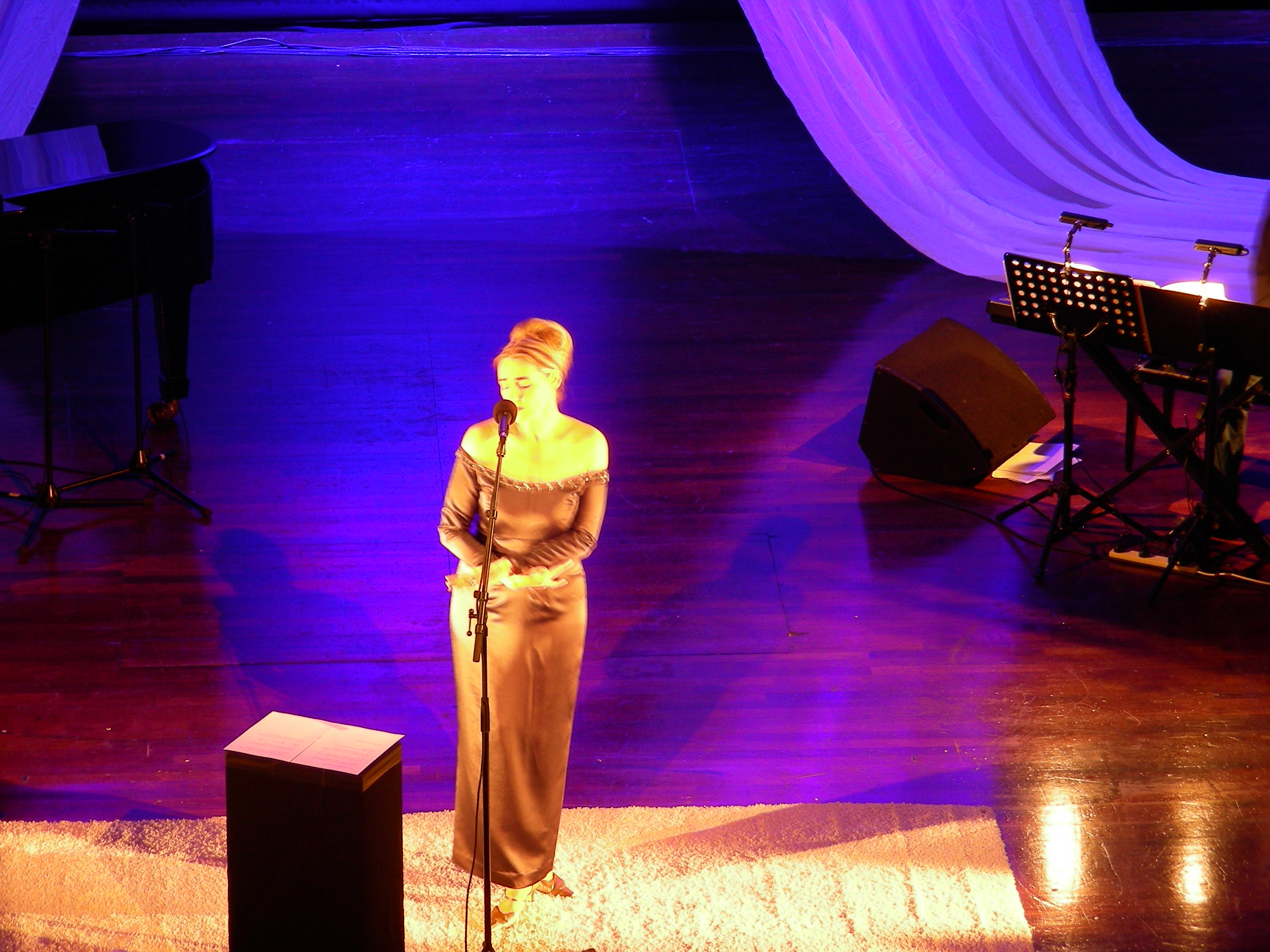
Rotterdam, Netherlands 2007

- Miscellaneous
  - Compilation entitled "From Belgrave with Love" ("Mossaic" by Lisa Gerrard and "Summer house" by Microfilm) 1981
  - The Future Sound of London sample her vocals from the song "Dawn of the Iconoclast" for their 1992 hit single "Papua New Guinea" (1992)
  - Compilation entitled "These Wings without Feathers" ("Dreamsong" and "Untitled") (1996)
  - Guest performer for the industrial/electronic music group Delerium entitled "Forgotten Worlds" on the album Karma (1997)
  - "The Wings of a Film – The Music of Hans Zimmer" ("Now We Are Free" live)
  - With Orbital: "One Perfect Sunrise" on the album The Blue Album (2004)
  - Orbital featuring Lisa Gerrard: "One Perfect Sunrise" (radio mix) CD single
  - Orbital featuring Lisa Gerrard: "One Perfect Sunrise" (Phil Hartnoll mix) CD single
  - With Denez Prigent: "J'attends – Gortoz A Ran" with Denez Prigent on the album Irvi
  - "An Hini a Garan" with Denez Prigent on the album Sarac'h
  - Mantras of a Lost Archetype (unreleased solo album)
  - The Ashes and Snow art exhibition by Gregory Colbert, (with Patrick Cassidy and Michael Brook, "Devota", "Vespers", "Womb", "Wisdom")
  - View from a Window collaborative song recording in track title "There in Your Arms" (2008) with Josiah Brooks
  - "Wisdom of Wind" composition with Jeff Rona, recorded by Tarja Turunen for her album My Winter Storm (2007) and present in the "Enough" single (2009)
  - "The Storm", song in collaboration with Hungarian composer Balázs Havasi on the album Symphonic II (2013)
  - "Lament" and "Epitaph", collaboration with Polish composer Zbigniew Preisner on the album Diaries of Hope (2013)
  - Guest performer for the electronic music artist Chicane entitled "38 Weeks" and "Orleans" on the album (The Whole is Greater Than) The Sum of Its Parts (2015)
  - "Come Tenderness" (2024), compilation released by Gerrard Records

== Film score ==
- Dèmoni 2 (1986) (as Dead Can Dance)
- El Niño de la Luna (1989) (as Dead Can Dance, also with Gerrard in her acting debut)
- Baraka (1992) (as Dead Can Dance, with Michael Stearns)
- Heat (1995) featured previously recorded material from The Mirror Pool
- Nadro (1998)
- The 13th Warrior (1999) with Graeme Revell (score later withdrawn)
- The Insider: Soundtrack (1999), with Pieter Bourke
- Gladiator (2000) with Hans Zimmer
- Gladiator: More Music From the Motion Picture (2000, released 2001) with Hans Zimmer
- Mission: Impossible 2 (2000) with Hans Zimmer
- Black Hawk Down (2001) – Song: "J'attends – Gortoz A Ran" with Denez Prigent
- Ali (2001) with Pieter Bourke
- 9/11 (2002) – Song: "Sorrow" composed with Hans Zimmer
- Whale Rider (2003)
- Tears of the Sun (2003) with Hans Zimmer
- The West Wing (Television) (2003) – Song: "Sanvean" in the episode 7A WF 83429
- King Arthur (2004) – Song: "Amergin's Invocation"
- One Perfect Day (2004)
- The Passion of the Christ (2004) with Patrick Cassidy (score withdrawn)
- Man on Fire (2004) with Harry Gregson-Williams
- 'Salem's Lot (TV mini-series) (2004) with Patrick Cassidy and Christopher Gordon
- Layer Cake (2004)
- A Thousand Roads (2005) with Jeff Rona
- Constantine (2005) (score incomplete and withdrawn)
- Fateless (2005) with Ennio Morricone ("A song", "A Voice from the Inside", "Return to the Life")
- Seoul Train (2005)
- The Greater Meaning of Water (2006) previously recorded material
- The Mist (2007) (The Host of Seraphim)
- Playing for Charlie (2008)
- Ichi (2008) with Michael Edwards
- Henry Poole Is Here (2008)
- Balibo (2009)
- Ryomaden (2010) Theme Song to TV Series
- From Ararat to Zion (2010) with Ara Torosyan
- Legend of the Guardians: The Owls of Ga'Hoole (2010) -"The Host of the Seraphim" (DCD) and "Coming Home" (solo).
- Oranges and Sunshine (2010)
- Tears of Gaza (2010)
- Samsara (sequel to Baraka) composer of original music, with Michael Stearns and Marcello De Francisci
- Priest – vocals and additional music
- Rurouni Kenshin (2012)
- Man of Steel (2012) – trailer: "Elegy"
- I, Frankenstein (2013)
- The Bible (2013) with Hans Zimmer
- Son of God (2014) with Hans Zimmer
- The Water Diviner (2014)
- Tanna (2015)
- Jane Got a Gun (2015)
- 2:22 (2017) with James Orr
- Zack Snyder's Justice League (2021) – Trailer (Mixed with "Praxis" by TOTEM)
- Dune (2021)
- Dune: Part Two (2024)
- Gladiator II Trailer and song "Now We Are Free". (2024)

== Video game composing and contributions ==
- Deus Ex: Human Revolution (2011)
- Armello (2015) with Michael Allen
