= 1928 in poetry =

Nationality words link to articles with information on the nation's poetry or literature (for instance, Irish or France).

== Events ==
- January 16 – English novelist and poet Thomas Hardy's ashes are interred in Poets' Corner of Westminster Abbey in London; pallbearers at the ceremony include Stanley Baldwin, J. M. Barrie, John Galsworthy, Edmund Gosse, A. E. Housman, Rudyard Kipling, Ramsay MacDonald and George Bernard Shaw. At the same time, Hardy's heart is interred where he wished to be buried, in the grave of his first wife, Emma, in the churchyard of his parish of birth, Stinsford ("Mellstock") in Dorset. Later in the year, his widow Florence publishes the first part of a biography, The Early Life of Thomas Hardy, 1840–1891 (Macmillan), in fact largely dictated by Hardy.
- September 21 – The Gorseth Kernow is set up at Boscawen-Un in Cornwall by Henry Jenner ("Gwas Myghal") and others.
- November 6 – Xu Zhimo writes his poem 再別康橋 (simplified Chinese 再别康桥, Zài Bié Kāngqiáo, "On Leaving Cambridge Once More").
- Russian poets Daniil Kharms and Alexander Vvedensky found OBERIU (a Russian acronym for "An Association of Real Art"), an avant-garde grouping of Russian post-Futurist poets in the 1920s-1930s
- American poets Charles Reznikoff, George Oppen and Louis Zukofsky meet in New York City; they will become some of the founders of the Objectivist poets group.
- The only surviving fragment of Erinna's Greek poem The Distaff (probably first half of the 4th century BCE) is found in the Oxyrhynchus Papyri.
- The clerihew, the comic pseudo-biographical verse form associated with Edmund Clerihew Bentley, is mentioned in print for the first time.

== Works published in English ==
=== Canada ===
- Dorothy Livesay, Green Pitcher. Toronto: Macmillan.
- Seranus, Later Poems and New Villanelles (Toronto: Ryerson).
- Arthur Stringer, A Woman At Dusk and Other Poems. Indianapolis: Bobbs-Merrill.

=== India, in English ===
- V. N. Bhusan, Silhouettes, Masulpatam: Youth of Asia Society; India, Indian poetry in English
- Joseph Furtado, A Goan Fiddler
- Shyam Sunder Lal Chordia, Chitor and Other Poems, Bombay: D. B. Taraporevala Sons and Co.

=== United Kingdom ===
- Rupert Brooke, Collected Poems, see also 1946
- Roy Campbell, The Wayzgoose, a lampoon, in rhyming couplets, on the cultural shortcomings of South Africa; South African native published in the United Kingdom, and at this time living there
- W. H. Davies, Collected Poems
- T. S. Eliot:
  - "Perch' Io non Spero" (later to become part I of Ash Wednesday, published in 1930) was published in the Spring, 1928 issue of Commerce along with a French translation.
  - A Song for Simeon printed in September by Faber & Gwyer as part of its Ariel poems series.
- H. S. Milford, editor, The Oxford Book of English Verse of the Romantic Period, 1798–1837: 1798–1837, Clarendon Press, anthology
- Thomas Hardy, Winter Words in Various Moods and Metres, (posthumous)
- D. H. Lawrence, Collected Poems
- John Masefield, Midsummer Night, and Other Tales in Verse
- Laura Riding, Love as Love, Death as Death
- Siegfried Sassoon, The Heart's Journey
- A. J. A. Symons, An Anthology of 'Nineties' Verse
- Humbert Wolfe:
  - The Silver Cat, and Other Poems
- This Blind Rose
- W. B. Yeats, Irish poet published in the United Kingdom):
  - The Tower, including "Sailing to Byzantium" and "Leda and the Swan", Irish
  - The Death of Synge, and Other Passages from an Old Diary (poetry)

=== United States ===
- W. H. Auden, Poems
- Stephen Vincent Benét, John Brown's Body
- E. E. Cummings, Christmas Tree
- John Gould Fletcher, The Black Rock
- Robert Frost, West-Running Brook
- Robert Hillyer, The Seventh Hill
- Robinson Jeffers, Cawdor and Other Poems
- William Ellery Leonard, A Son of Earth
- Archibald MacLeish, The Hamlet of A. MacLeish
- Edgar Lee Masters, Jack Kelso: A Dramatic Poem
- Joseph Moncure March, "The Wild Party"
- Edna St. Vincent Millay, The Buck in the Snow
- Dorothy Parker, Sunset Gun
- Ezra Pound:
  - Selected Poems, edited by T. S. Eliot, London, American poet living in Europe
  - A Draft of the Cantos 17–27
- Edward Arlington Robinson, Sonnets, 1889–1927
- Carl Sandburg, Good Morning, America
- Allen Tate, Mr. Pope and Other Poems, including "Ode to the Confederate Dead"
- Amos Wilder, Arachne: poems, Yale University Press
- Elinor Wylie, Trivial Breath
- Louis Zukofsky completes the original versions of "A" 1, 2, 3 and 4, which have been compared to Pound's Cantos; the fragmentary long poem will be a lifelong project

=== Other in English ===
- John Le Gay Brereton, Swags Up, Australia
- Roy Campbell, The Wayzgoose: A South African Satire, South Africa
- W. B. Yeats, Irish poet published in the United Kingdom:
  - The Tower, including "Sailing to Byzantium" and "Leda and the Swan", Irish
  - The Death of Synge, and Other Passages from an Old Diary (poetry)

== Works published in other languages ==
=== France ===
- René Char, Les Cloches sur le coeur
- Léon-Paul Fargue:
  - Banalité
  - Vulturne
- Francis Jammes, Diane
- Pierre Jean Jouve, Les Noces
- Alphonse Métérié, Nocturnes
- Benjamin Péret, Le grand jeu
- Pierre Reverdy, La Balle au bond
- Tristan Tzara, pen name of Sami Rosenstock, Indicateur des chemins de coeur

=== Indian subcontinent ===
Including all of the British colonies that later became India, Pakistan, Bangladesh, Sri Lanka and Nepal. Listed alphabetically by first name, regardless of surname:

- Cherian Mappila, also known as "Cheriyan Mappila", Shri Yesu Vijayam (also spelled "Sriyesuvijayam"), long poem about the life of Jesus, India, Malayalam language; a poem on a Christian theme; called the first major contribution to Indian literature by a Christian poet
- Nalini Bala Devi, Sandhiyar Sur, Assamese
- Peer Ghulam Mohammad Hanafi, Bagh-O Bahar, tales in verse in the Kashmiri language, derived from Urdu tales
- Sri Sri, Prabhava, Telugu
- Vakil Ghulam Ahmad Shah Qureshi, Pani Gulzar, Kashmiri

=== Spanish language ===
==== Spain ====
- Vicente Aleixandre, Ambito ("Milieu"), the author's first book of poems
- Federico García Lorca, Primer romancero gitano ("Gypsy Ballads")
- Jorge Guillén, Cántico, first edition, with 75 poems in five sections (enlarged edition, with 125 poems, 1936)

==== Other in Spanish ====
- Martín Adan, La case de cartón, a novel in verse, Peru
- Nellie Campobello, Yo, Mexico
- José Varallanos, El hombre del Ande que asesinó su esperanza, Peru

=== Other languages ===
- Nérée Beauchemin, Patrie intime, French language, Canada
- Uri Zvi Greenberg, Hazon Ehad Ha-Legionot ("A Vision of One of the Legions"), Hebrew language, Mandatory Palestine
- Aaro Hellaakoski, Jääpeili, Finland
- Stefan George, Das neue Reich ("The New Reich"), Germany
- Federico García Lorca, Romancero gitano ("Gypsy Ballads"), Spain
- Eugenio Montale, Ossi di seppia ("Cuttlefish Bones"), second edition, with six new poems and an introduction by Alfredo Gargiulo (first published in 1925; third edition, 1931), Lanciano: Carabba, Italy
- Takahashi Shinkichi, Takahashi Shinkichi shishu ("Poetical Works by Takahashi Shinkichi"), Tokyo: Nanso Shoin, Japan (Surname: Takahashi)
- J. Slauerhoff, Eldorado, Dutch

== Awards and honors ==
- Pulitzer Prize for Poetry: Edwin Arlington Robinson wins his third Pulitzer Prize for Poetry this decade, this time for Tristram

== Births ==
Death years link to the corresponding "[year] in poetry" article:

- January 1 – Iain Crichton Smith (died 1998), Scottish poet and fiction writer in both English and Scottish Gaelic
- January 8 – Gaston Miron (died 1996), Canadian poet and author
- January 10 – Philip Levine (died 2015), American poet, educator and winner of the Pulitzer Prize for Poetry
- January 29 – Gene Frumkin (died 2007), American poet
- February 2 – Cynthia Macdonald (died 2015, American poet
- February 14 – Bruce Beaver (died 2004), Australian poet
- February 25 – Hushang Ebtehaj (H. E. Sayeh) (died 2022), Persian poet
- March 1 – Conrad Hilberry (died 2017), American poet
- March 4 – Alan Sillitoe (died 2010), English poet and writer, one of the "Angry Young Men" of the 1950s
- March 13 – Bob Brissenden (died 1991), Australian poet
- March 18 – Dave Etter (died 2015), American poet
- March 28 – Vayalar Rama Varma (died 1975), Indian, Malayalam-language poet and film songwriter
- April 4 – Maya Angelou (died 2014), African-American poet
- April 7 – Gael Turnbull (died 2004), Scottish poet
- April 26 – Hertha Kräftner (died 1951), Austrian poet
- May 4 – Thomas Kinsella (died 2021), Irish poet, translator, editor and publisher
- May 11 – Luo Fu (or Lo Fu, pen name of Mo Luofu; died 2018), Chinese-language Taiwanese poet, writer and translator
- June 24 – ruth weiss (died 2020), German-born American poet of the Beat Generation
- June 27 – Peter Davison (died 2004), American poet, essayist, teacher, lecturer, editor and publisher
- July 4 – Ted Joans (died 2003) African-American trumpeter, jazz poet and painter
- September 20
  - Alberto de Lacerda (died 2007), Mozambique-born Portuguese poet
  - Donald Hall (died 2018), American poet and U.S. Poet Laureate
- September 22
  - Irving Feldman, American poet and educator
  - Édouard Glissant (died 2011), French-Martiniquan poet and writer.
- October 17 – Rosemary Tonks (died 2014), English poet and novelist
- October 28 – Yu Guangzhong (余光中) (died 2017), Chinese writer, poet, educator and critic
- November 9 – Anne Sexton (died 1974), American poet and winner of the Pulitzer Prize for Poetry in 1967
- December 3 – Karin Bang (died 2017), Norwegian novelist and poet
- December 10 – Milan Rufus (died 2009), Slovak poet and academic
- December 15 – William Dickey (died 1994), American poet
- December 23 – Anthony Cronin (died 2016), Irish poet
- Also:
  - Carol Bergé (died 2006), American poet
  - Rasa Chughtai (died 2018), Indian-born Pakistani poet

== Deaths ==
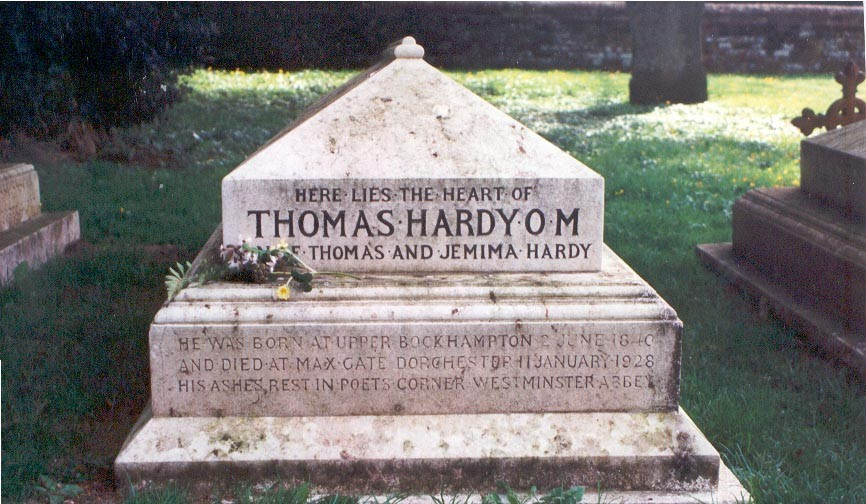
Burial place of Thomas Hardy's heart

Death years link to the corresponding "[year] in poetry" article:

- January 11 – Thomas Hardy (born 1840), English novelist and poet
- February 5 – David McKee Wright (born 1869), Irish-born poet and journalist, active in New Zealand and Australia
- February 19 – Ina Coolbrith (born 1841), American poet, writer and librarian
- March 18 – Paul van Ostaijen (born 1896), Belgian poet
- March 24 – Charlotte Mew (born 1869), English poet, from suicide
- May 16 – Edmund Gosse (born 1849), English poet and critic
- July 20 – Kostas Karyotakis (born 1896), Greek poet
- August 16 – Antonín Sova (born 1864), Czech poet and librarian
- September 17 – Bokusui Wakayama, 若山 牧水 (born 1885), Japanese "Naturalist" tanka poet
- December 16 – Elinor Wylie (born 1885), American poet and novelist

== See also ==
- Poetry
- List of years in poetry
- New Objectivity in German literature and art
- Oberiu movement in Russian art and poetry
