= Winter Words =

Winter Words may refer to:

- Winter Words (album), by All About Eve
- Winter Words (song cycle), by Benjamin Britten
- Winter Words in Various Moods and Metres, a poetry collection by Thomas Hardy, basis for Britten's song cycle
