= Silver Tree (disambiguation) =

Silver Tree may refer to:

- Silver Tree, film producer
- Silver Tree Day Camp, a San Francisco Recreation & Parks Department Summer day camp
- Silver Tree fountain, a famous construction of the Mongol Empire
- The Silver Tree, an album by Lisa Gerrard

== Trees ==
- Silver fir, a common name for several trees
- Silver pine, a common name for several trees
- Leucadendron argenteum, a species of tree from South Africa

== Fiction ==
- Celeborn, a character in Tolkien's The Lord of the Rings whose name means "silver tree"
- Silver-Tree, a character in Gold-Tree and Silver-Tree, a Scottish fairy tale
- Telperion, or the Silver Tree, one of the Two Trees of Valinor in J.R.R. Tolkien's fictional universe
