= Joie de vivre =

Cheerful enjoyment of life; an exultation of spirit

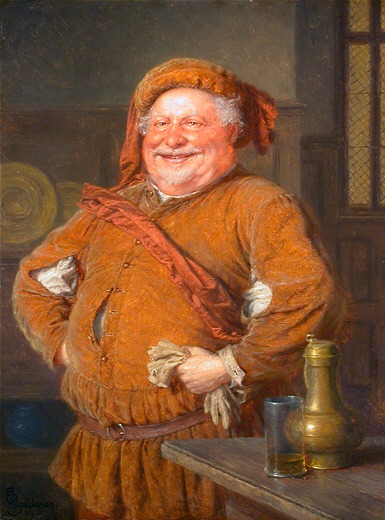
Eduard von Grützner's depiction of Falstaff, a literary character well known for his joie de vivre.

Joie de vivre (/ˌʒwɑː də ˈviːv(rə)/ ZHWAH də VEEV(-rə), French: [ʒwa d(ə) vivʁ]; 'joy of living') is a French phrase often used in English to express a cheerful enjoyment of life, an exultation of spirit, and general happiness.

It "can be a joy of conversation, joy of eating, joy of anything one might do… And joie de vivre may be seen as a joy of everything, a comprehensive joy, a philosophy of life, a Weltanschauung". Robert's Dictionnaire says "joie" is sentiment exaltant ressenti par toute la conscience, that is, involves one's whole being."

== Origins and development ==
Casual use of the phrase in French can be dated back at least as far as Fénelon in the late 17th century, but it was only brought into literary prominence in the 19th century, first by Michelet (1857) in his pantheistic work Insecte, to contrast the passive life of plants with animal joie de vivre, and then by Émile Zola in his book of that name from 1883–84.

Thereafter, it took on increasing weight as a mode of life, evolving at times almost into a secular religion in the early 20th century; and subsequently fed into Lacanian emphasis on "a jouissance beyond the pleasure principle" in the latter half of the century – a time when its emphasis on enthusiasm, energy and spontaneity gave it a global prominence with the rise of hippie culture.

== Psychology ==
20th-century proponents of self-actualization such as Abraham Maslow or Carl Rogers saw, as one of the by-products, the rediscovery of what the latter called "the quiet joy in being one's self...a spontaneous relaxed enjoyment, a primitive joie de vivre".

Joie de vivre has also been linked to D. W. Winnicott's concept of a sense of play, and of access to the true self.

== Adaptations ==
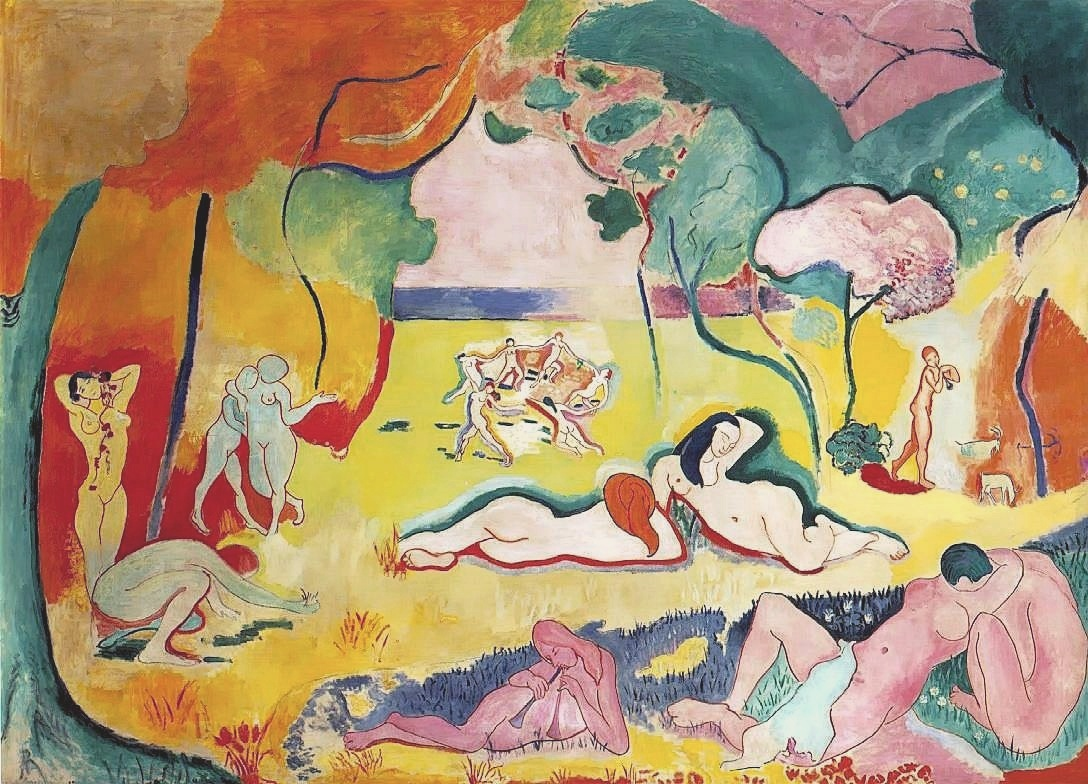
Henri Matisse, Le bonheur de vivre, 1905–06

It is usually referenced in its standard French form, but various corruptions are observed such as joie de vie, which would translate to "joy of life". The Matisse painting Le bonheur de vivre translates as, "The Happiness of Life".

== See also ==
- Wiktionary:Bon vivant
- Carpe diem
- Dolce far niente
- Dunya
- Élan vital
- Epicurus
- Ikigai
- Intentional living
- Je ne sais quoi
- Jouissance
- Laissez les bons temps rouler
- Quality of life
- François Rabelais
- Experience itself as a good
- Wine, women and song
