= Uusi =

Uusi means "new" in Finnish and may refer to:

- New Student House, Helsinki, student house in Helsinki, Finland, also known as Uusi
- Gunnar Uusi (1931–1981), Estonian chess player

== See also ==
- Uusi Runo, poetry collection by Aaro Hellaakoski
- Uusi Suomi, Finnish newspaper
