= Sailing to Byzantium =

Poem by William Butler Yeats

"Sailing to Byzantium", by William Butler Yeats, is a poem first published in the collection October Blast (1927) and then republished in the collection The Tower (1928); Yeats dedicated "Sailing to Byzantium" to the artist Norah McGuinness. "Sailing to Byzantium" is a poem in four stanzas of ottava rima, each composed of eight lines of iambic pentameter to narrate a journey to the city of Byzantium (Constantinople). In the poem, Yeats muses about the convergence of immortality, art, and the human spirit and describes the metaphorical journey of a man pursuing his own vision of eternal life and conception of paradise.

== Synopsis ==
Written in 1926 (when Yeats was 60 or 61), "Sailing to Byzantium" is Yeats's definitive statement about the agony of old age and the imaginative and spiritual work required to remain a vital individual even when the heart is "fastened to a dying animal" (the body). Yeats's solution is to leave the country of the young and travel to Byzantium, where the sages in the city's famous gold mosaics could become the "singing-masters" of his soul. He hopes the sages will appear in fire and take him away from his body into an existence outside time, where, like a great work of art, he could exist in "the artifice of eternity." This is a reference to the legend that when the Turks entered the church (Hagia Sophia) in 1453, the priests who were singing the Divine Liturgy took up the sacred vessels and disappeared into the wall of the church, where they will stay and only come out when the church is returned to Christendom. In the final stanza of the poem, he declares that once he is out of his body he will never again appear in the form of a natural thing; rather, he will become a golden bird, sitting on a golden tree, singing of the past ("what is past"), the present (that which is "passing"), and the future (that which is "to come").

The Golden Bough is a reference to the Aeneid, book VI, by the Roman poet Virgil (70–19 BC), where it is offered as a gift by Trojan hero Aeneas to Proserpina to enter the gate of the underworld. Aeneas' father Anchises describes the spirit inside every body

The seeds of life—
fiery is their force, divine their birth, but they
are weighed down by the bodies' ills or dulled
by earthly limbs and flesh that's born for death.
That is the source of all men's fears and longings,
joys and sorrows, nor can they see the heavens' light,
shut up in the body's tomb, a prison dark and deep.

— Aeneid VI: 730-734

This describes the tension between physicality and spirituality, mortality and immortality, which are the themes of this poem.

== Interpretation ==
Yeats wrote in a draft script for a 1931 BBC broadcast:

I am trying to write about the state of my soul, for it is right for an old man to make his soul, and some of my thoughts about that subject I have put into a poem called 'Sailing to Byzantium'. When Irishmen were illuminating the Book of Kells, and making the jeweled croziers in the National Museum, Byzantium was the centre of European civilization and the source of its spiritual philosophy, so I symbolize the search for the spiritual life by a journey to that city.

John Crowe Ransom comments: "The prayer is addressed to holy sages who dwell I know not where; it does not seem to matter where, for they seem qualified to receive the prayer, and it is a qualified and dignified prayer."

Epifanio San Juan writes that the action of the poem "occurs in the tension between memory and desire, knowledge and intuition, nature and history, subsumed within a vision of eternal order".

Cleanth Brooks asks whether, in this poem, Yeats chooses idealism or materialism and answers his own question, "Yeats chooses both and neither. One cannot know the world of being save through the world of becoming (though one must remember that the world of becoming is a meaningless flux aside from the world of being which it implies)".

== Influence ==
A second poem written by W. B. Yeats, "Byzantium", extends and complements "Sailing to Byzantium". It blends descriptions of the medieval city in nighttime darkness with spiritual, supernatural and artistic imagery.

Canadian author Guy Gavriel Kay's historical fantasy two-part series The Sarantine Mosaic was inspired by this poem.

The poem is referenced extensively in Philip Roth's 2001 novel The Dying Animal, which also takes its title from the poem.

A phrase in the opening line of the poem, "no country for old men," has been adopted as the title for many literary works, most notably as the novel No Country for Old Men by Cormac McCarthy and its film adaptation, as well as the short story "No Country for Old Men" by Seán Ó Faoláin, and the novel No Country for Young Men by Julia O'Faolain.

The title of the poem itself has also been adopted as the title of a science fiction novella by Robert Silverberg, an unpublished novel by film director Michael Cimino, and a song by Lisa Gerrard and Patrick Cassidy on the album Immortal Memory.

It also yielded an Irish television documentary, WB Yeats – No Country for Old Men, in 2013, which won an IFTA Award for Best Direction by Maurice Sweeney.
