= Dziękuję bardzo =

Live album by Klaus Schulze
- Released: 29 May 2009
- Recorded: 12–13 November 2008 in Warsaw and Berlin
- Genre: Space music, ambient
- Length: 171:46
- Label: SPV/InsideOut/Revisited
- Producer: Klaus Schulze

Klaus Schulze chronology
Rheingold (2008)	Dziękuję bardzo (2009)	Big in Japan: Live in Tokyo 2010 (2010)

Professional ratings
Review scores
Source	Rating
Allmusic	link

Dziękuję bardzo is the thirty-ninth album by Klaus Schulze. It was originally released in 2009, and, taking in consideration the previously released multi-disc box sets (Silver Edition, Historic Edition, Jubilee Edition, Contemporary Works I, and Contemporary Works II), it could be viewed as Schulze's one hundredth album. This is the third Schulze album with guest vocalist Lisa Gerrard. It was recorded at two concerts in Warsaw, Poland, and Berlin, Germany. This album was released as a set of three CDs, as well as a separate DVD. The album title means "Thank you very much" in Polish.

== Track listing ==
All tracks composed by Klaus Schulze. All lyrics by Lisa Gerrard.

Disc 1
No.	Title	Note	Length
1.	"Shoreless Two"	Warsaw; on DVD	28:23
2.	"Bazylika NSJ"	Warsaw; vocals by Lisa Gerrard; on DVD	41:34

Disc 2
No.	Title	Note	Length
1.	"Godspell"	Warsaw; vocals by Lisa Gerrard; on DVD	20:25
2.	"Shoreless One"	Berlin	33:14

Disc 3
No.	Title	Note	Length
1.	"Ocean of Innocence"	Berlin; vocals by Lisa Gerrard	41:32
2.	"Spanish Ballerina"	Berlin; vocals by Lisa Gerrard; on DVD ds	6:38
