= Nimettömiä lauluja =

Nimettömiä lauluja is a 1918 poetry collection by Finnish poet Aaro Hellaakoski. The poems use satirical tones reflecting feelings of inadequacy and loneliness.

== Extract ==
An extract of the middle stanza in part V:

Ma hiljaa akkunani avaan.--

Nyt kaiken vasta kuulenkin!

Kuin meren kuohu rantoihin

niin pauhu siel' on loputon,

kaik' surmanaseet kuoroon kammottavaan

taas kilvan yhtynehet on.

== External links and sources ==
- Petri Liukkonen. "Aaro Hellaakoski". Books and Writers.
- / Nimettömiä lauluja poetry book
