= Dolce far niente =

Poem by Aaro Hellaakoski

"Dolce far niente" is a poem by Finnish poet Aaro Hellaakoski. First published in his 1928 collection Jääpeili ('The ice mirror') notable especially for its experimental typography, it was the subject of a study into the relationship between manuscript (or proof) and print version.
