= Sanctuary (2006 film) =

2006 film

Sanctuary: Lisa Gerrard
- Directed by: Clive Collier
- Release date: September 2006
- Running time: 90 minutes
- Country: United Kingdom
- Language: English

Sanctuary, or Sanctuary: Lisa Gerrard, is a 2006 documentary film about life and work of Australian musician and singer Lisa Gerrard. It is directed by Clive Collier. The film was released for sale online in September 2006. It includes extensive interviews of Gerrard and also people she has collaborated with in her career, including Michael Mann, Hans Zimmer, Russell Crowe, Graeme Revell, Harry Gregson-Williams, Brendan Perry, Niki Caro and Pietro Scalia.
