= Huojuvat Keulat =

1946 poetry collection by Aaro Hellaakoski

1947 edition (publ. WSOY)

Huojuvat Keulat is a 1946 poetry collection by Finnish poet Aaro Hellaakoski. The poems consist of short verses reflecting on nature and travel through the landscape.

== Extract ==
A race of sucklers, with gnashing jaws,

you finished the tale of the dinosaurus,

but you'll never rise above the earth

as we: you're dust and soil and dearth,

an organised pack with famished maws. -

Maybe you'll rise from your mud one day.

How much, it's up to you say."

(from 'The Last Dinosaur' in Huojuvat keulat, 1946)

== Sources ==
- Petri Liukkonen. "Huojuvat Keulat". Books and Writers.
