= Me Kaksi =

Me Kaksi is a 1920 poetry collection by Finnish poet Aaro Hellaakoski. The poems use satirical tones reflecting feelings of inadequacy and loneliness.

== Sources ==
- Petri Liukkonen. "Aaro Hellaakoski". Books and Writers.
