= Stars Are Burning =

Stars are Burning

Live album by Klaus Schulze
- Released: 1 December 2014
- Recorded: 16 April 1977 (during a concert in Brussels) & 28 October 1979 (during a concert in Arnhem)
- Genre: Electronic music, space music
- Length: 139:40
- Label: Mirumir
- Producer: Klaus D. Mueller

Klaus Schulze chronology
| Big in Europe (2013-14) | Stars are Burning (2014) | Eternal (2017) |

Stars are Burning is the forty-third album by Klaus Schulze. Taking into consideration the previously released multi-disc box sets (Silver Edition, Historic Edition, Jubilee Edition, Contemporary Works I, and Contemporary Works II), it could be viewed as Schulze's one hundred and fourth album. On the LP release of the album, the tracks on the second disc are omitted, and replaced by "Invisible Musik", a track previously released on the 2008 compilation Muting the Noise 01.

== Track listing ==
All tracks composed by Klaus Schulze.

Disc 1

| No. | Title | Length |
|---|---|---|
| 1. | "Stars Are Burning" | 48:48 |
| 2. | "The Nightingale's Complaint" | 23:24 |

Disc 2

| No. | Title | Length |
|---|---|---|
| 1. | "Tell Me Where All Past Years Are" | 33:43 |
| 2. | "There Shall Be Sung Another Golden Age" | 33:45 |
