= Big in Europe =

42nd album by Klaus Schulze

Big in Europe Vol. 1

Live album by Klaus Schulze and Lisa Gerrard
- Released: 29 November 2013
- Recorded: 17 September 2009; Warsaw, Poland
- Genre: Space music, ambient
- Length: 58:22
- Label: MIG Music
- Producer: Klaus Schulze

Klaus Schulze and Lisa Gerrard chronology
Shadowlands (2013)	Big in Europe Vol. 1 (2013)	Stars Are Burning (2014)

Big in Europe is the 42nd album by Klaus Schulze, initially designed to be released in three volumes over three years. Only two volumes were released in 2013–14. Taking in consideration the previously released multi-disc box sets (Silver Edition, Historic Edition, Jubilee Edition, Contemporary Works I, and Contemporary Works II), it could be viewed as Schulze's one hundred and third album. This series of volumes chronicles Klaus Schulze's European tour with Lisa Gerrard in 2009.

== Volume 1 (Warsaw) ==
The first volume of Big in Europe was released on 29 November 2013 and contains the entire performance in Warsaw, Poland on 17 September 2009, a concert dedicated to the 70th anniversary of the Soviet invasion of Poland during World War II. In addition to the CD, two DVDs are also included, the second of which contains the documentary "Moogomentary" and the first of which duplicates the audio disc. At this event, a promotional disc was available, Hommage à Polska, containing a new studio Klaus Schulze and Lisa Gerard track, not included on this release.

=== Track listing ===
All tracks composed by Klaus Schulze.

No.	Title	Length
1.	"Voices of Wielun"	7:46
2.	"Kampania Wrzesniowa"	6:03
3.	"Selbsterkennende Ganzwerdung"	27:15
4.	"A la recherche du printemps perdu"	6:58
5.	"The Da Varsaw Code"	10:28

Big in Europe Vol. 2

Live album by Klaus Schulze and Lisa Gerrard
- Released: 19 September 2014
- Recorded: 20 September 2009; Amsterdam, Netherlands
- Genre: Space music, ambient
- Length: Disc 1: 46:24; Disc 2: 65:32
- Label: MIG Music
- Producer: Klaus Schulze

Klaus Schulze and Lisa Gerrard chronology
Shadowlands (2013)	Big in Europe Vol. 2 (2014)	Stars Are Burning (2014)

== Volume 2 (Amsterdam) ==
The second volume of Big in Europe was released on 19 September 2014, and contains the entire performance in Amsterdam, Netherlands on 20 September 2009. In addition to the two CDs, two DVDs are also included, the first duplicating the audio discs, and the second containing the second part of the "Moogomentary" documentary.

=== Track listing ===
All tracks composed by Klaus Schulze.

Disc 1

No.	Title	Length
1.	"Jan Pieterszoon Sweelinck"	8:47
2.	"Mad Ret Sma"	6:39
3.	"Prinsengracht 263"	18:11
4.	"Polish Rider"	12:44

Disc 2

No.	Title	Length
1.	"Orcus Humanum Est"	19:05
2.	"Leiden"	19:40
3.	"Hieronymus"	13:07
4.	"Le Moulin Deja Vu"	13:36

== Personnel ==
- Klaus Schulze – electronics
- Lisa Gerrard – vocals
