= Duality (Lisa Gerrard and Pieter Bourke album) =

Studio album by Lisa Gerrard and Pieter Bourke
- Released: 14 April 1998
- Recorded: 1997
- Studio: Lisa Gerrard's home studio, Gippsland, Australia
- Genre: World fusion, baroque orchestral
- Length: 45:46
- Label: 4AD
- Producer: Lisa Gerrard and Pieter Bourke

Lisa Gerrard chronology
| The Mirror Pool (1995) | Duality (1998) | Immortal Memory (2004) |

Pieter Bourke chronology
| Duality (1998) |

Professional ratings
Review scores
| Source | Rating |
|---|---|
| AllMusic | 3/5 stars |

Duality is a collaborative album by Lisa Gerrard and Pieter Bourke released in 1998. It was Lisa Gerrard's second post-Dead Can Dance album after The Mirror Pool from 1995. Lisa Gerrard and Brendan Perry released their last album in 1996 and had officially disbanded Dead Can Dance earlier in 1998.

At the ARIA Music Awards of 1998, the album was nominated for ARIA Award for Best World Music Album.

== Overview ==
The beginning of the song "Shadow Magnet" influenced, in part, the music at the beginning of the Gladiator soundtrack (music by Hans Zimmer and Lisa Gerrard). The track "Nadir (Synchronicity)" was initially intended for use at the end of that film. However, due to copyright issues, a song 'influenced' by this track was used instead.

"Tempest" and "Sacrifice" were used for the Insider soundtrack.

== Track listing ==
All tracks by Pieter Bourke and Lisa Gerrard except where noted.

| No. | Title | Length |
|---|---|---|
| 1. | "Shadow Magnet" | 7:54 |
| 2. | "Tempest" (Bourke, Gerrard, Madjid Khaladj) | 5:49 |
| 3. | "Forest Veil" | 2:31 |
| 4. | "The Comforter" | 1:26 |
| 5. | "The Unfolding" | 4:35 |
| 6. | "Pilgrimage of Lost Children" | 3:48 |
| 7. | "The Human Game" | 6:56 |
| 8. | "The Circulation of Shadows" | 1:56 |
| 9. | "Sacrifice" | 7:47 |
| 10. | "Nadir (Synchronicity)" | 3:02 |

== Sources ==
- Aston, Martin. Facing the Other Way: The Story of 4AD. London: The Friday Project, 2013. ISBN 978-0-0074-8961-9
