= Dave Etter =

American poet

David Pearson Etter (March 18, 1928 – July 10, 2015) was an American poet. He was known for poems evoking small-town midwestern life. His most famous volume was written as 222 monologues in the voices of citizens of the imaginary community of "Alliance, Illinois," which was based in part on his experiences living for many years in his adopted hometown of Elburn, Illinois.

Reviewing an early collection of his work, poet Lisel Mueller notes that Etter was “strongly influenced by Masters, Lindsay, and Sandburg, he is a chronicler of Midwest prairie towns and the disappearing race of semi-rural people, with their inarticulate dreams and dark secrets”. Poet Jay Paul noted that Etter converted colloquialism into “a poetic innovation that displays the variety and humor of midwestern speech."

Etter's poems have been published in eight foreign countries and translated into German, Polish, and Japanese. He published thirty books and chapbooks of his own poems, which were included in over 100 textbooks and anthologies. The literary journal Spoon River Quarterly published a special issue in 1983 devoted to Dave Etter, including an autobiographical essay, and interviews with the poet by Norbert Blei, Robert C. Bray, Victor Contoski, Jim Ellege, and Dan Jaffe.

== Biography ==
Etter was born in Huntington Park, California. He received a degree in history from the University of Iowa in 1953. He served two years in the U. S. Army. At age 30 he settled in the midwest, living in turn in Evanston, Geneva, Lilly Lake, and Elburn, Illinois. He was an editor of the Encyclopædia Britannica from 1964 to 1973. He was a manuscript editor at Northern Illinois University Press from 1974 to 1980.

== Awards ==
- He won a Carl Sandburg Award for poetry in 1981-82 for the book West of Chicago.
- He won a Society of Midland Authors Kenneth F. Montgomery Poetry Award in 1967 for the book Go Read the River.
- He received the Illinois Sesquicentennial Commission Poetry Prize.
- He won the Theodore Roethke award from the journal Poetry Northwest in 1971.

== Bibliography ==
- Go Read the River (1966), University of Nebraska Press
- Last Train to Prophetstown (1968), University of Nebraska Press
- Strawberries (1970), Northeast/Juniper Books
- Crabtree's Woman (1972), BkMk Press
- 8x8: New Poems, in Broadside Format (1975), Dunes House
- Bright Mississippi (1975), Juniper Press
- Well, You Needn't: The Thelonious Monk Poems (1975), Raindust Press
- Television (1977), Poetry in Public Places
- Central Standard Time: New and Selected Poems (1978), BkMk Press
- Open to the Wind (1978), Uzzano Press
- Riding the Rock Island through Kansas (1979), Wolfsong
- Cornfields (1980), Spoon River Poetry Press
- Hollyhocks (1980), Pentagram Press
- West of Chicago (1981), Spoon River Poetry Press
- Boondocks (1982), Uzzano Press
- Alliance, Illinois (1983), Northwestern University Press
- Home State: A Prose Poem (1985), Spoon River Poetry Press
- Live at the Silver Dollar (1986), Spoon River Poetry Press
- Selected Poems (1987), Spoon River Poetry Press
- Electric Avenue (1988), Spoon River Poetry Press
- Midlanders (1988), Spoon River Poetry Press
- Carnival (1990), Spoon River Poetry Press
- Sunflower Country (1994), Spoon River Poetry Press
- I Want to Talk About You (1995), Cross Roads Press
- How High the Moon (1996), Spoon River Poetry Press
- Next Time You See Me (1997), Wolfsong
- The Essential Dave Etter (2001), Spoon River Poetry Press
- Greatest Hits, 1960-2000 (2000), Pudding House Publications
- Looking for Sheena Easton (2004), Spoon River Poetry Press
- The Liontamer's Daughter: Poems of Humor and Satire (2008), Red Dragonfly Press
- Dandelions: New Poems (2010), Red Dragonfly Press
- Blue Rain: New Poems (2012), Red Dragonfly Press
- The Yellow House (2014), Red Dragonfly Press
