= Immortal Memory =

Studio album by Lisa Gerrard and Patrick Cassidy
- Released: 26 January 2004
- Genre: Modern classical, world fusion
- Length: 56:58
- Label: 4AD
- Producer: Lisa Gerrard and Patrick Cassidy

Lisa Gerrard chronology
Duality (1998)	Immortal Memory (2004)	The Silver Tree (2006)

Patrick Cassidy chronology
Immortal Memory (2004)

Professional ratings
Review scores
Source	Rating
Allmusic	4/5 stars
The Guardian	4/5 stars
Prefix	4/5 stars
Christianity Today	(positive)

Immortal Memory is an album by Dead Can Dance member Lisa Gerrard and Irish classical composer Patrick Cassidy, released in 2004. It was Gerrard's first studio release since 1998's Duality with Pieter Bourke.

== Overview ==
Gerrard first met Cassidy in 2000 in Los Angeles (where he lives), when she came to work on the Gladiator soundtrack, and they planned to work together one day. When they eventually found a shared two-month break, they joined at Gerrard's Australian studio for this record.

The W. B. Yeats poem "Sailing to Byzantium" inspired the track of the same name.

The lyrics utilise three ancient languages:

- Gaelic (ancient Irish) in "The Song of Amergin" (based on the first song supposedly sung by a mortal on Irish soil).
- Aramaic in "Maranatha" (meaning "come lord, come teacher"), and "Abwoon" (meaning "our father", a rendition of the "Lord's Prayer" in the language of Jesus).
- Latin in "Psallit in Aure Dei" (meaning "singing in the ear of God", a dirge for Patrick Cassidy's late father).

== Track listing ==
No.	Title	Length
1.	"The Song of Amergin"	5:27
2.	"Maranatha (Come Lord)"	3:43
3.	"Amergin's Invocation"	6:19
4.	"Elegy"	6:41
5.	"Sailing to Byzantium"	5:04
6.	"Abwoon (Our Father)"	4:12
7.	"Immortal Memory"	4:28
8.	"Paradise Lost"	7:03
9.	"I Asked for Love"	5:00
10.	"Psallit in Aure Dei"	9:01

Music by Lisa Gerrard (tracks 1–9) and Patrick Cassidy (tracks 1–10).

== Personnel ==
Musical

- Lisa Gerrard – arranger, vocals
- Patrick Cassidy – arranger, synthesized instruments

Technical

- Simon Bowley – mixing
- David Badrick – mixing assistance
- Don C. Tyler – mastering
- Chris Staley – mastering assistance
- Jacek Tuschewski – technical assistance

Graphical

- Jacek Tuschewski – sleeve design, paintings
- Chris Bigg – sleeve design
- Mark Magidson – sleeve photography (Uluru tree)
- Greg Barrett – sleeve photography (portraits)
