= Victor Contoski =

American poet, translator, and educator

- Born: 1936 (age 89–90) Minneapolis, Minnesota, U.S.
- Occupation: Writer
- Education: University of Wisconsin–Madison (PhD)
- Genre: Science fiction

Victor Contoski (born 1936, Minneapolis, Minnesota) is an American writer and university professor of Polish descent, best known for his science-fiction chess story Von Goom's Gambit, published in The Magazine of Fantasy & Science Fiction, December 1966. He got his Ph.D. in American Literature from the University of Wisconsin–Madison in 1969. In 1980 he edited a book of poetry by poets of Polish ancestry, Blood of Their Blood. He has published multiple volumes of poetry and taught creative writing and American Literature at the University of Kansas. In 2000, he was recipient of the HOPE Teaching Award, chosen by students. He is retired and resides in Lawrence, Kansas.

== Bibliography ==
- "Von Goom's Gambit", Chess Review, April 1966, reprinted in The Magazine of Fantasy and Science Fiction, December 1966.
- Four Contemporary Polish Poets (translations), Quixote, 1967
- Astronomers, Madonnas, and Prophecies (poetry), Juniper, 1972
- Broken Treaties (poetry), New Rivers, 1973
- Planting Beeches (translations of Harasymoxicz), New Rivers, 1975
- Names (poetry), New Rivers, 1979
- Unease (translations of Rozewicz), New Rivers, 1980
- A Kansas Sequence (poetry), Tellus, 1983
- Midwestern Buildings (poetry), Cottonwood, 1997
- Homecoming (poetry), New Rivers, 2000
