= Uusi Runo =

First edition

Uusi Runo is a 1943 poetry collection by Finnish poet Aaro Hellaakoski.

The title meaning "new poem" - was written during the Continuation War at night following Helaakoski's absence from writing in the 1930s.

== Extract ==
Jos on sinua

niin kuin minua

kiskottu kahtaalle, uuvuksiin,

tietänet senkin:

uupuenkin

alati uudestisynnyttiin

(from 'Pientä kokoa' in the collection Uusi runo, 1943)

== External links and sources ==
- Petri Liukkonen. "Uusi Runo". Books and Writers.
