= Silver pine =

Silver pine is a common name for several trees and may refer to:

- Manoao colensoi, native to New Zealand
- Pinus monticola, native to western North America
