= Winter Words in Various Moods and Metres =

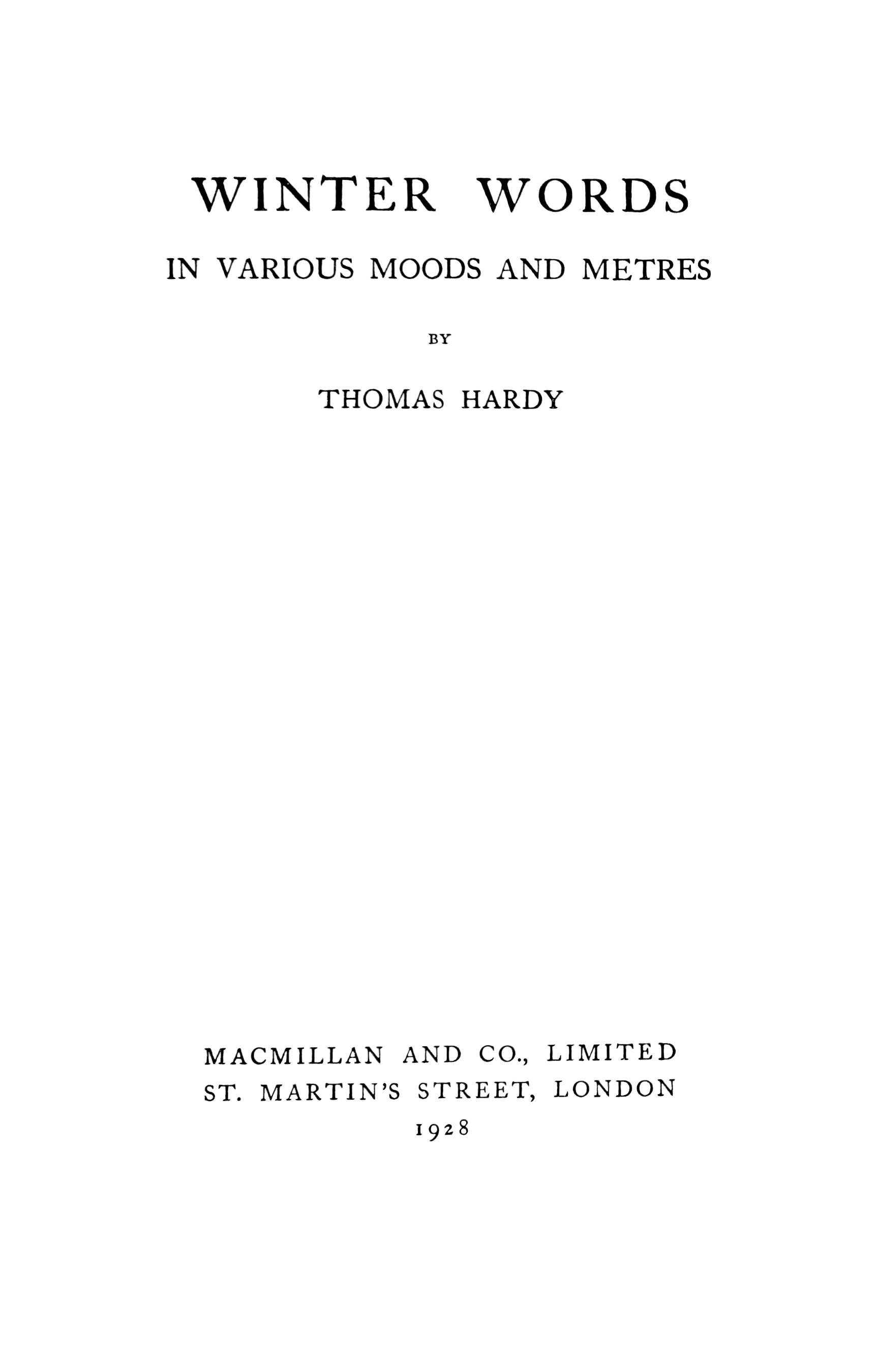

Winter Words in Various Moods and Metres is the last, posthumous collection of poems by English poet Thomas Hardy, and was published in 1928. The collection shows Hardy continued his metrical experimentation to the end, with his poetic energies undiminished.

== Themes ==
While the collection mainly featured recent poems (post 1925), the subject matter was diverse and ranged back over much of Hardy's past. Notable autobiographical poems include "A Private Man on Public Men", and "So Various".

Hardy was insistent in his Introductory Note that “no harmonious philosophy is attempted in these pages – or in any bygone pages of mine, for that matter”. The collection closes with the poet's final farewell: "He Resolves to Say No More".

== See also ==
- Winter Words (song cycle)
