= Rasa Chughtai =

Pakistani poet (1928–2018)

- Born: Mirza Mohtashim Ali Baig; 1928; Sawai Madhopur, Rajasthan, British India
- Died: 5 January 2018 (aged 89–90); Karachi, Pakistan
- Citizenship: British India (1928–1947); India (1947–1951); Pakistan (1951–2018)
- Occupation: Poet
- Known for: Rekta; Zanjeer-e-Hamsaigi; Tere Aane Ka Intezaar Raha

Rasa Chughtai (born Mirza Mohtashim Ali Baig; 1928 – 2018) was a Pakistani poet in Urdu who was known for his poetry compilations Zanjeer-e-Hamsaigi and Tere Aane Ka Intezaar Raha.

== Personal life ==
Chughtai was born in Sawai Madhopur, Rajasthan in 1928. In 1951, he migrated from India to Pakistan. On 5 January 2018, he died in Karachi.

== Works ==
He was author of following works:

- Rekta
- Zanjeer-e-Hamsaigi
- Tere Aane Ka Intezaar Raha
