= The Silver Tree =

Studio album by Lisa Gerrard
- Released: 2006
- Recorded: 2006
- Genre: Ambient, world music
- Length: 61:38
- Label: Rubber Records
- Producer: David Badrick and Lisa Gerrard

Lisa Gerrard chronology
Immortal Memory (2004)	The Silver Tree (2006)	Farscape (2008)

Professional ratings
Review scores
Source	Rating
AllMusic	3.5/5 stars

The Silver Tree is a 2006 album by Lisa Gerrard. It was her first solo album release since The Mirror Pool (1995). The album was initially released in digital format; followed by CD versions at the end of 2006, first in Australia by Rubber Records, followed by releases by Nettwerk in Europe, Sonic Records in Poland and Storm Creation in the United Kingdom. A U.S. release by Rubber in 2007 contained an extra track, "Entry".

The album was short-listed for the 2006 Australian Music Prize. It peaked at No. 4 on the Billboard New Age Albums chart.

== Reception ==
Steve Hochman of the Los Angeles Times described it as "hypnotic, atmospheric", while AllMusic critic Thom Jurek praised the album, saying, "Gerrard's fans will find this irresistible, despite its lack of drama, and ambient music fans will no doubt appreciate its various textures, dimensions, and closely knit sonics. Yes, it is beautiful, and spiritual, and moving in places, but it is secretive, mysterious, and engaging on the aural level as a text as well.

== Track listing ==
All compositions by Lisa Gerrard; except where noted.

No.	Title	Writer(s)	Length
1.	"In Exile"		6:04
2.	"Shadow Hunter"		2:04
3.	"Come Tenderness"		3:29
4.	"The Sea Whisperer"		4:26
5.	"Mirror Medusa"		4:50
6.	"Space Weaver"	Lisa Gerrard, Michael Edwards	7:21
7.	"Abwoon"		3:57
8.	"Serenity"		3:30
9.	"Towards the Tower"		10:22
10.	"Wandering Star"		2:33
11.	"Sword of the Samurai"		1:35
12.	"Devotion"		8:02
13.	"The Valley of the Moon"		3:25
Total length:			61:38

Certain CD versions contain "Entry" as a bonus track 14

== Personnel ==
- Composed and performed by Lisa Gerrard
- Engineered and produced by David Badrick and Lisa Gerrard (except "The Sea Whisperer" and "Serenity" engineered and produced by Michael Edwards and Lisa Gerrard)
- "In Exile" and "Towards The Tower" orchestrations by Patrick Cassidy
- Mastered by Don Tyler
- Art direction and design by Clive Collier
