= Sanvean =

Song performed by Lisa Gerrard

Song by Dead Can Dance

from the album Toward the Within
- Written: September 1993
- Released: October 24, 1994
- Recorded: November 1993
- Venue: Mayfair Theatre, Santa Monica, California
- Genre: Neoclassical dark wave
- Length: 4:05
- Label: 4AD
- Songwriters: Lisa Gerrard, Andrew Claxton
- Producers: Brendan Perry, Lisa Gerrard

"Sanvean: I am your shadow" is a song co-written in September 1993 by Lisa Gerrard and composer/multi-instrumentalist Andrew Claxton during rehearsals in Ireland for the 1993 Dead Can Dance international tour. Lisa Gerrard stated she wrote this song missing her family who had remained in Australia. Its first public performance was in Sligo, Ireland and first recorded on their 1994 live album Toward the Within, and later on Gerrard's 1995 solo album The Mirror Pool and The Best of Lisa Gerrard in 2007. Like most of her work it is sung in a euphonic and emotional pseudo-language.
