= Jääpeili =

Jääpeili is a 1928 poetry collection by Finnish poet Aaro Hellaakoski, considered by contemporary Finnish literature critics to be one of his best works.

== Overview ==
The poetry's innovative pictorial typography in the poems "Sade" and "Dolce far niente" recalled Apollinaire's Calligrammes (1918); "Sade" especially recalls his "Il pleut", and both are classified as visual poetry. Other sources of inspiration for the poems were extracted from Cubism and the works of the Italian poet F.T. Marinetti, writer of the Manifeste du futurisme (1912).

Hellaakoski's enthusiasm about urban visual landscape is present in the poems that also had connections with the youthful romanticism of other Finnish writers such as Mika Waltari and Olavi Paavolainen.

== External links and sources ==
- Petri Liukkonen. "Jääpeili". Books and Writers.
- http://www.hs.fi/juttusarja/kritiikinklassikot/artikkeli/Aaro+Hellaakoski+J%C3%A4%C3%A4peili+Runoja/1135223001685
