= The Mirror Pool =

Studio album by Lisa Gerrard
- Released: 21 August 1995
- Recorded: Eaton Studio, Melbourne; ABC Studios, Melbourne; Lisa Gerrard's home studio, Gippsland
- Genre: World fusion, baroque orchestral
- Length: 68:04
- Label: 4AD
- Producer: Lisa Gerrard

Lisa Gerrard chronology
The Mirror Pool (1995)	Duality (1998)

Singles from The Mirror Pool
- 1. "Sanvean (I Am Your Shadow)" Released: 1995

Professional ratings
Review scores
Source	Rating
AllMusic	3/5 stars

The Mirror Pool is Lisa Gerrard's debut solo album, released by 4AD in 1995 (one year before the release of Spiritchaser, the last work Dead Can Dance issued before disbanding in 1998).

== Overview ==
Among this album's musicians was Pieter Bourke, who later co-wrote Gerrard's 1998 album Duality.

Gerrard explained the album title: "If you read about African music, they believe that during the process of making this music that you come into contact with spirits from another plane. They say that this place is like a mirror of the world we live in, [...] With the best music, you don't find the composer or the musicians within the work, you find yourself, your own feelings."

The album's repertoire spans seven years, from 1988 to 1995, featuring some of her material not worked into Dead Can Dance albums. Gerrard noted, "There is usually a surplus of work that overlaps the continuous nature of a Dead Can Dance record. Some of these pieces, which were not realized for reason of continuity, have been collected together in the form of largely orchestral-based works and pieces written primarily for 'voice' music."

- "La Bas" refers to French writer Joris-Karl Huysmans's controversial 1891 novel Là-bas (meaning "Down There"); a main character is the bell-ringer Carhaix from Brittany, obsessed with legends of prophetic bells, echoing the fabled bells of the drowned cathedral of Ys in Brittany.
- "The Rite" was taken from Gerrard's libretto for a 1991 production of Oedipus Rex.
- "Persian Love Song" is a traditional piece from Shiraz in southern Iran, arranged by Gerrard. It was previously performed in concerts by Dead Can Dance and eventually included on their 1994 live album Toward the Within.
- "Sanvean" and "Gloradin" (under the name "Gloridean") were written in September 1993. Both were previously performed in concerts by Dead Can Dance and eventually included on Toward the Within.
- "Largo" is the opening aria from Handel's opera Serse (Xerxes), a popular composition titled "Ombra mai fu" but usually nicknamed "Largo" (despite being larghetto).
- "Laurelei" is a variant spelling of the Lorelei Rhine maiden, so as not to conflict with a song by fellow 4AD artists Cocteau Twins .
- "Celon" was written a few days before Gerrard gave birth to her daughter: "[...] there's this weird thing that takes place, thinking about procreation, sex, and death -- you get very morbid just before you have a baby.". The River Celon is a fictional river in J. R. R. Tolkien's mythology.

== In popular culture ==
The tracks "La Bas (Song of the Drowned)", "Celon" and "Gloradin" were used for the 1995 Heat soundtrack.

== Track listing ==
No.	Title	Length
1.	"Violina (The Last Embrace)"	5:43
2.	"La Bas (Song of the Drowned)"	7:41
3.	"Persian Love Song (The Silver Gun)"	2:33
4.	"Sanvean (I Am Your Shadow)"	3:48
5.	"The Rite"	3:22
6.	"Ajhon"	3:09
7.	"Glorafin"	4:50
8.	"Majhnavea's Music Box"	1:34
9.	"Largo"	2:52
10.	"Werd"	1:39
11.	"Laurelei"	5:58
12.	"Celon"	6:06
13.	"Venteles"	2:37
14.	"Swans"	5:47
15.	"Nilleshna"	6:29
16.	"Gloradin"	3:56

Music by Lisa Gerrard, except 3 (traditional, arranged by Gerrard), 4 (Gerrard, Andrew Claxton), 9 (Handel, public domain), and 11 (arranged by Gerrard, Bonnar, Kyryakou).

== Personnel ==
Musical

- Lisa Gerrard – vocals, yang ch'in/yangqin (7, 11, 14), arranger (3, 11)
- John Bonnar – orchestra conductor/arranger (1–4, 7, 10, 12–13), arranger (11), keyboards (9, 11), vocals (5, 12)
- Pieter Bourke – vocals (5 intro), bass tabla (7), camel drum (7), large/small derabukka/darabukka/darabeka (14), handclapping (14)
- Dimitry Kyryakou – bouzouki (7, 11, 14), vocals (5 intro), arranger (11)
- Jacek Tuschewski – vocals (5, 12)
- The Victorian Philharmonic Orchestra – full orchestra (1–4, 7), woodwind section (10, 12–13)

Technical

- Lisa Gerrard – producer (all), engineer (5–6, 8–9, 11, 14–16) at Gerrard Studio (Gippsland, Australia)
- Jacek Tuschewski – engineer (5–6, 8–9, 11, 14–16) at Gerrard Studio (Gippsland, Australia)
- Robin Gray – engineer (orchestra 1–4, 7) at Eaton Studio (Melbourne, Australia)
- Garry Havrillay – engineer (woodwind 10, 12–13) at ABC Studios (Melbourne, Australia)
- Guy Charbonneau – mixing (all)
- Charlie Bouis – mixing assistance (all)

Graphical

- Jacek Tuschewski – front cover art
- Dennis Keeley – sleeve photography (portrait)
- Chris Bigg – sleeve design

Acknowledgements

- Ivo Watts-Russell (founder of 4AD), Nanette and John Gerrard, Michael Atkinson – "thank you [...] for their invaluable efforts"
- Dolby Model 740 Spectral Processor (courtesy Dolby Laboratories) – sonic enhancement (all)
