= Patrick Cassidy (composer) =

Irish composer

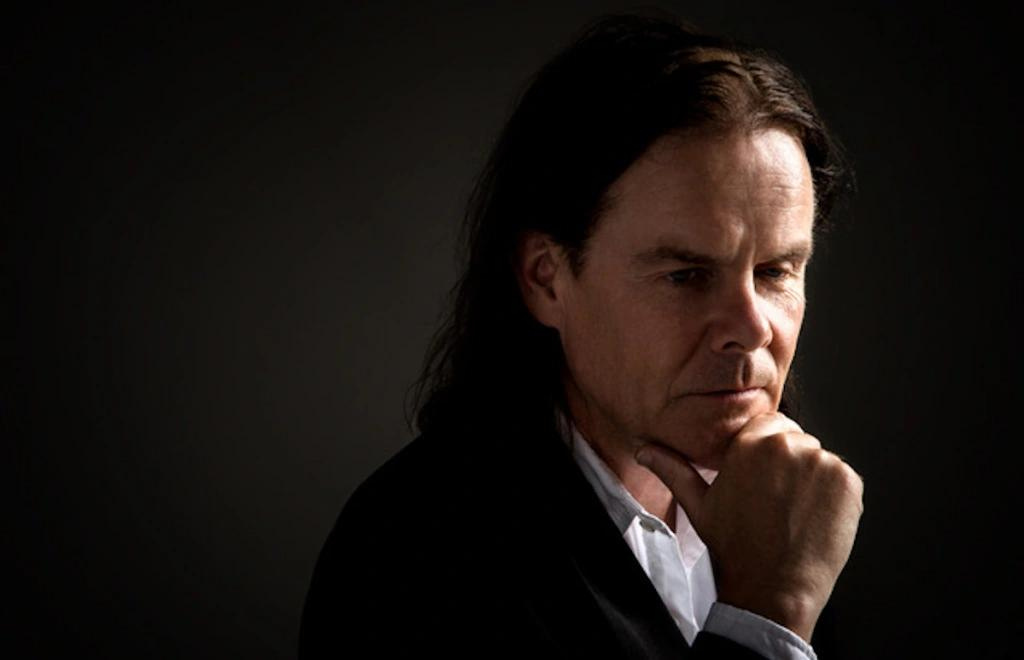
- Born: Claremorris, County Mayo, Republic of Ireland
- Education: University of Limerick
- Occupation: Composer
- Notable work: Vide Cor Meum
- Honours: Cavaliere dell'Ordine della Stella d'Italia (knight of the Order of the Star of Italy)
- Website: patrickcassidy.com

Patrick Cassidy is an Irish orchestral, choral, and film score composer.

== Early life and education ==
Cassidy was born in Claremorris, County Mayo in Ireland. He received a BSc in applied mathematics from the University of Limerick in 1985 and supported his early compositional activities with a day job as a statistician and technology analyst.

== Work ==
Cassidy is known for his narrative cantatas – works he has written for orchestra and choir based on Irish mythology – and for the aria "Vide Cor Meum" originally composed for the film Hannibal, directed by Ridley Scott. The libretto for Cassidy's "Vide Cor Meum" was taken from Dante's first sonnet in La Vita Nuova. Cassidy's opera Dante premiered at Theater Hof in Bavaria in 2024

The Children of Lir, released in September 1993, remained at number one in the Irish classical charts for a full year. It was the first cantata written in the Irish language. The BBC later produced an hour-long documentary on the piece. Famine Remembrance, a commissioned piece to commemorate the 150th anniversary of the Great Famine in Ireland, was premiered in New York's St. Patrick's Cathedral in 1996. In June 2007, the piece was performed at the opening of Toronto's Ireland Park with the then President of Ireland as a special guest.

Other albums include Cruit (arrangements of 17th- and 18th-century Irish harp music with Cassidy as the soloist) and Deirdre of the Sorrows, another cantata in the Irish language, recorded with the London Symphony Orchestra and the Tallis Chamber Choir in 1998. In 2004, Immortal Memory was released as a collaboration between Cassidy and Lisa Gerrard.

Cassidy now divides his time between Los Angeles and Ireland, where in addition to his concert work he has scored films and documentaries. He is a relative of the singer Sibéal Ní Chasaide who sang his composition Mise Eire at the official government commemorations of the 1916 Rising.

Cassidy's song Proclamation was played at the inauguration of Joe Biden in Washington DC on 20 January 2021.

== Honours ==
Cassidy is a knight of the Order of the Star of Italy, conferred by the president of Italy, and bestowed with the title of Cavaliere dell'Ordine della Stella d'Italia. He received the Outstanding Contribution to Culture/Arts Alumni Award 2007 the University of Limerick. After receiving public submissions, a road was renamed Patrick Cassidy Road in Claremorris, County Mayo, in 2022.

== Compositions ==
- The Children of Lir
- Famine Remembrance
- Deirdre of the Sorrows
- The Mass
- The Mass for Organ and Choir
- Dante, opera
- Kylemore Magnificat

== Film and television ==
Cassidy provided music for the following:

- Hannibal (2001)
- Veronica Guerin (2003)
- Confessions of a Burning Man (2003)
- Salem's Lot (2004)
- King Arthur (2004)
- Layer Cake (2004)
- Che Guevara (2005)
- Ashes and Snow (2005)
- Kingdom of Heaven (2005)
- The Front Line (2006)
- Breaking the Ice (2007)
- Edgar Allen Poe's Ligeia (2008)
- Escape to Freedom – The Aviator (2008)
- Kill the Irishman (2011)
- In 2010, Cassidy's Funeral March was used in the trailer for The Tree of Life.
- Calvary (2014)
- 1916: The Irish Rebellion (2016)
- Smalltown (2016)
- No Words Needed: Croke Park 2007 (2017)
- Bad Suns (2020)

== Recordings ==
- 1998: Cruit
- 1993: The Children of Lir (London Symphony Orchestra and Tallis Chamber Choir)
- 1997: Famine Remembrance
- 1998: Deirdre of the Sorrows
- 2004: Immortal Memory – with Lisa Gerrard
- 2006: Ashes and Snow – with Lisa Gerrard
- 2014: Calvary
- 2016: 1916: The Irish Rebellion
- 2019: The Mass
- 2021: The Mass – Organ and Choir
- 2024: Kylemore Magnificat
