= Aaro Hellaakoski =

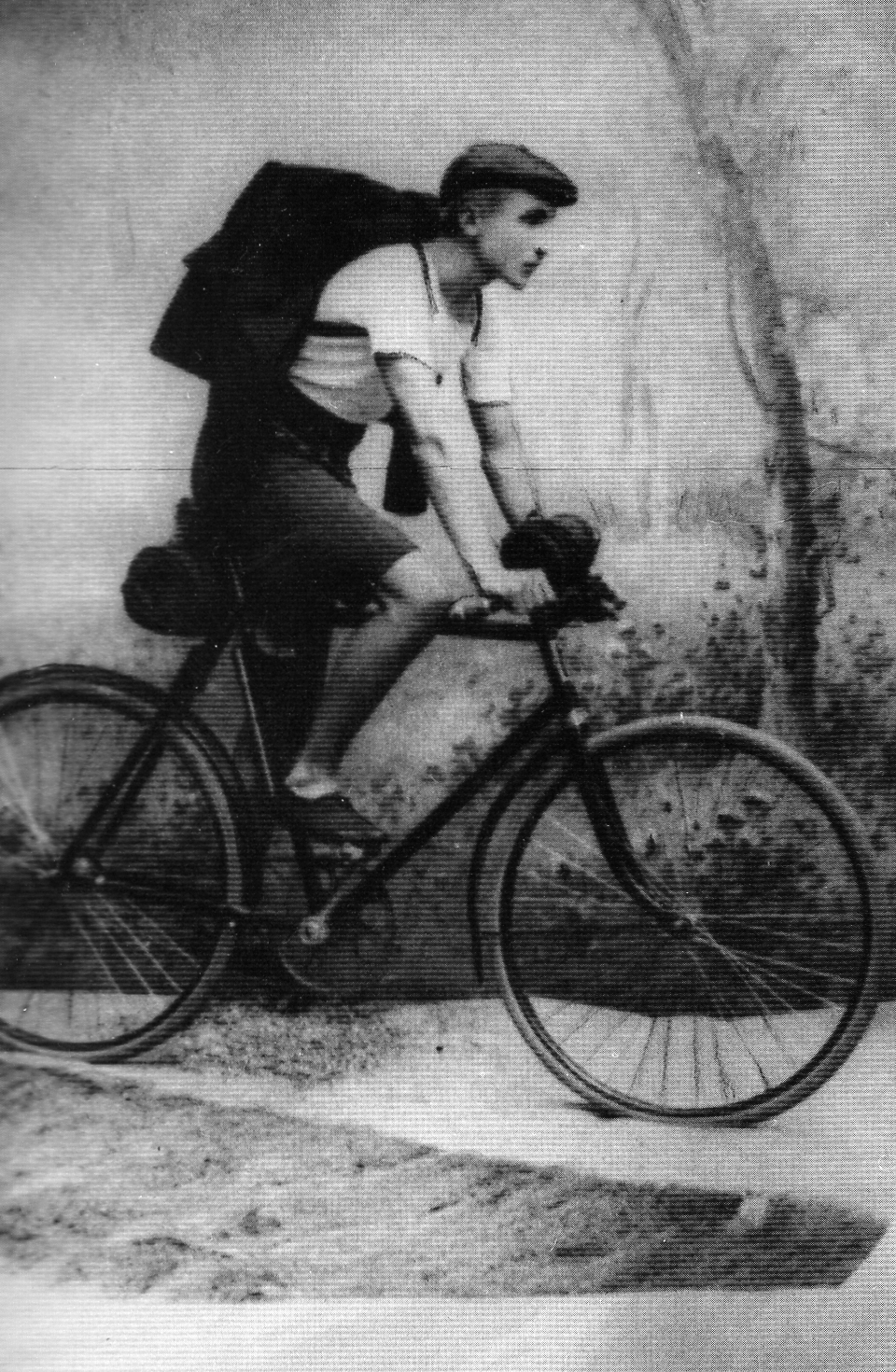
Aaro Hellaakoski in 1913

Aaro Hellaakoski (June 22, 1893 – November 23, 1952) was a Finnish poet whose work includes some of the earliest examples of modernism in Finnish literature.

Hellaakoski was born in Oulu. By profession he was a geographer conducting studies in physical geography and geomorphology and working as a school teacher of geography as well as a university teacher. As a geographer he published scientific studies on topics such as the geological history of lake Saimaa and the geological history of lake Puula and spent his summers in geomorphological fieldwork in the Finnish Lakeland for many years. He also wrote some geography textbooks for schools together with other scholars.

== Examples of poetry ==
=== 1943 ===
Jos on sinua

niin kuin minua

kiskottu kahtaalle, uuvuksiin,

tietänet senkin:

uupuenkin

alati uudestisynnyttiin

(from 'Pientä kokoa' in the collection Uusi runo, 1943)

=== 1946 ===
A race of sucklers, with gnashing jaws,

you finished the tale of the dinosaurs,

but you'll never rise above the earth

as we: you're dust and soil and dearth,

an organised pack with famished maws. -

Maybe you'll rise from your mud one day.

How much, it's up to you say."

(from 'The Last Dinosaur' in Huojuvat Keulat, 1946)

== Bibliography ==
=== Poetry ===
- Runot, 1916
- Nimettömiä lauluja, 1918
- Me kaksi, 1920
- Elegiasta oodiin, 1921
- Maininki ja vaahtopää, 1924
- Jääpeili, 1928
- Valitut runot, 1940
- Vartiossa, 1943
- Uusi runo,
- Huojuvat keulat, 1946
- Hiljaisuus, 1949
- Sarjoja, 1952
- Huomenna seestyvää, 1953,
- Nimettömiä lauluja, 1918

=== Prose ===
- Suljettujen ovien takana, 1923. (novel)
- Iloinen yllätys, 1927. (short stories)

=== Essays and art criticism ===
- Kuuntelua, 1950.
- T. K. Sallinen, 1921.
- Niinkuin minä näin, 1959.

=== Scientific works ===
- Puulan järviryhmän kehityshistoria, 1928.
- Suursaimaa, 1922.
