= Winter Words (song cycle) =

Song cycle based on Thomas Hardy's poetry

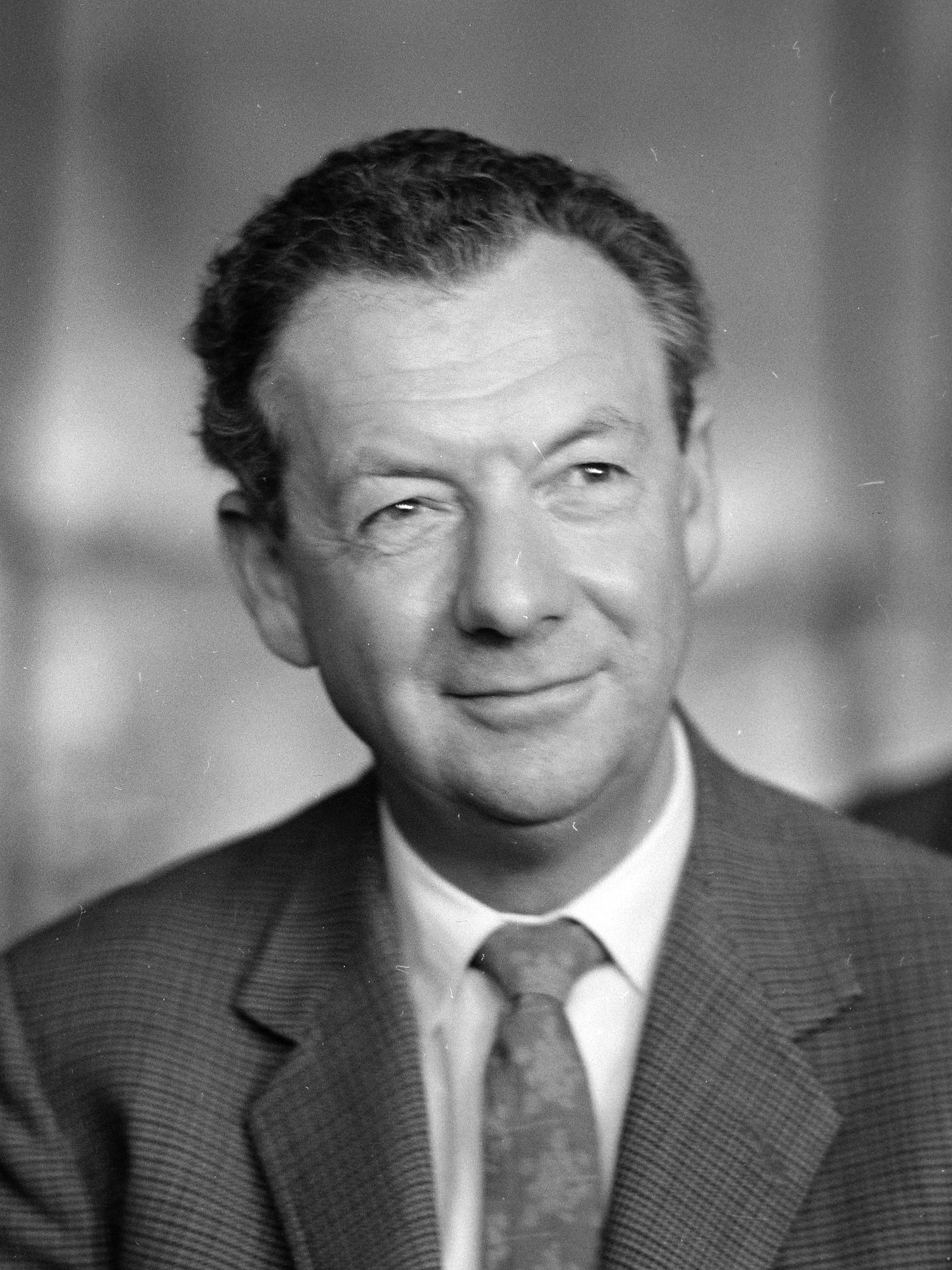
Benjamin Britten in 1965

Winter Words, Op. 52, is a song cycle for tenor and piano by Benjamin Britten. Written in 1953, it sets eight poems by Thomas Hardy. The cycle is named after Hardy's last published collection, but the poems are from different parts of his collected poems.

The cycle was premiered at the Leeds Festival in October 1953, with Peter Pears singing and Britten at the piano. It was dedicated to John and Myfanwy Piper—Myfanwy Piper was the librettist of Britten's opera The Turn of the Screw, which was begun in 1953 and premiered the following year.

A performance takes about 22 minutes. The poems are:

1. "At Day-Close in November"
2. "Midnight on the Great Western" (or, "The Journeying Boy")
3. "Wagtail and Baby (A Satire)"
4. "The Little Old Table"
5. "The Choirmaster's Burial" (or, "The Tenor Man's Story")
6. "Proud Songsters (Thrushes, Finches and Nightingales)"
7. "At the Railway Station, Upway" (or, "The Convict and Boy with the Violin")
8. "Before Life and After"
