= Gladiator (2000 soundtrack) =

Original soundtrack of the 2000 film Gladiator

Gladiator: Music From the Motion Picture

Soundtrack album by Hans Zimmer and Lisa Gerrard
- Released: April 25, 2000
- Recorded: 2000
- Studios: Air Studios Lyndhurst, London
- Genre: Film score
- Length: 61:31
- Label: Decca Records
- Producers: Hans Zimmer; Klaus Badelt

Professional ratings
Review scores
Source	Rating
Allmusic	4/5 stars
Film Score Reviews	4.5/5 stars
Filmtracks	3/5 stars
SoundtrackNet	4/5 stars

Gladiator: Music From the Motion Picture is the original soundtrack album of the 2000 film Gladiator. The soundtrack was composed and arranged by Hans Zimmer and Lisa Gerrard and was released on April 25, 2000. It was conducted and orchestrated by Gavin Greenaway and performed by the Lyndhurst Orchestra.

The album won the Golden Globe Award for Best Original Score. It was also nominated for the Academy Award for Best Original Score and the BAFTA Award for Best Score ("Anthony Asquith Award for Film Music").

== Track listing ==
All music is composed by Hans Zimmer and Lisa Gerrard.

No.	Title	Length
1.	"Progeny"	2:13
2.	"The Wheat"	1:03
3.	"The Battle"	10:02
4.	"Earth"	3:01
5.	"Sorrow"	1:26
6.	"To Zucchabar"	3:16
7.	"Patricide"	4:08
8.	"The Emperor Is Dead"	1:21
9.	"The Might of Rome"	5:18
10.	"Strength and Honor"	2:09
11.	"Reunion"	1:14
12.	"Slaves to Rome"	1:00
13.	"Barbarian Horde"	10:33
14.	"Am I Not Merciful?"	6:33
15.	"Elysium"	2:41
16.	"Honor Him"	1:19
17.	"Now We Are Free"	4:14

== Charts ==
=== Weekly charts ===
Chart (2000)	Peak position
Hungarian Albums (MAHASZ)	15

=== Year-end charts ===
Year-end chart performance for Gladiator
Chart (2000)	Position
Canadian Albums (Nielsen SoundScan)	180

== Certifications ==
Region	Certification	Certified units/sales
Canada (Music Canada)	Gold	50,000^{^}
Italy (FIMI)	Gold	50,000^{*}
Poland (ZPAV)	Platinum	100,000^{*}
Spain (Promusicae)	Platinum	100,000^{^}
Switzerland (IFPI Switzerland)	Gold	25,000^{^}
United Kingdom (BPI)	Platinum	351,000
United Kingdom (BPI) Special Anniversary Edition	Silver	60,000^{*}
United States (RIAA)	Platinum	540,000
^{*} Sales figures based on certification alone.^{^} Shipments figures based on certification alone.

== More Music From the Motion Picture ==
Gladiator: More Music From the Motion Picture

Soundtrack album by Hans Zimmer and Lisa Gerrard
- Released: February 27, 2001
- Recorded: 2000
- Genre: Soundtrack
- Length: 57:58
- Label: Decca Records
- Producers: Alan Mayerson, Ridley Scott, Hans Zimmer

Professional ratings
Review scores
Source	Rating
AllMusic	2.5/5 stars
SoundtrackNet	4/5 stars
Tracksounds	4.5/5 stars

On February 27, 2001, nearly a year after the first soundtrack's release, Decca released Gladiator: More Music From the Motion Picture. The album contains eighteen additional tracks, including unused tracks and remixes of existing tracks. Many tracks contain dialogue from the film, such as the Maximus line "Father to a murdered son, husband to a murdered wife... and I will have my vengeance."

=== Track listing ===
No.	Title	Length
1.	"Duduk of the North" (Armenian duduk by Djivan Gasparyan and Sevak Sahakyan)	5:33
2.	"Now We Are Free" (Juba's mix)	4:47
3.	"The Protector of Rome" (featuring Russell Crowe as Maximus and Richard Harris as Marcus Aurelius)	1:25
4.	"Homecoming" (featuring Joaquin Phoenix as Commodus and Russell Crowe)	3:35
5.	"The General Who Became a Slave"	3:03
6.	"The Slave Who Became a Gladiator" (featuring Oliver Reed as Proximo and Russell Crowe as Maximus)	6:11
7.	"Secrets"	1:59
8.	"Rome is the Light"	2:43
9.	"All That Remains"	0:54
10.	"Maximus" (guitar by Heitor Pereira)	1:09
11.	"Marrakesh Marketplace"	0:42
12.	"The Gladiator Waltz" (featuring Russell Crowe, original synth demo version by Hans Zimmer)	8:25
13.	"Figurines" (yangqin by Lisa Gerrard)	1:01
14.	"The Mob"	2:22
15.	"Busy Little Bee" (featuring Connie Nielsen as Lucilla and Russell Crowe as Maximus)	3:47
16.	"Death Smiles at Us All" (featuring Joaquin Phoenix as Commodus and Russell Crowe as Maximus)	2:29
17.	"Not Yet" (featuring Djimon Hounsou as Juba)	1:32
18.	"Now We Are Free (Maximus Mix)"	6:21

== Special Anniversary Edition ==
Gladiator: Music From the Motion Picture: Special Anniversary Edition

Soundtrack album by Hans Zimmer and Lisa Gerrard
- Released: 2005
- Recorded: 2000
- Genre: Soundtrack
- Length: 1:59:29
- Label: Decca Records
- Producers: Alan Mayerson, Ridley Scott, Hans Zimmer

For the film's five-year anniversary, a double CD edition was released combining the two previous editions.

== 20th Anniversary Edition ==
Gladiator: Music From the Motion Picture: 20th Anniversary Edition

Soundtrack album by Hans Zimmer and Lisa Gerrard
- Released: 2020
- Genre: Soundtrack
- Length: 1:57
- Label: Decca Records
- Producers: Alan Mayerson, Ridley Scott, Hans Zimmer

For the film's 20th anniversary, a double CD edition was released mirroring the 2005 Special Anniversary Edition.

== Musical impact ==
In April 2006, a law firm representing the Holst Foundation filed a lawsuit claiming that Zimmer had infringed the copyright of composer Gustav Holst's The Planets. The organization claimed that Zimmer copied Holst's track "Mars, the Bringer of War" in the Gladiator score. The case was settled out of court.

Film music critics have noted that the Gladiator score also borrows from works by Richard Wagner, particularly themes from Siegfried and Götterdämmerung.

In 2003, the singer Luciano Pavarotti released the album Ti Adoro, which includes the song "Il gladiatore" ("The Gladiator"). Pavarotti told Billboard magazine that he was originally meant to sing this song for Gladiator, but ultimately decided against it.
