= Lisa Gerrard =

Australian musician, singer and composer (born 1961)

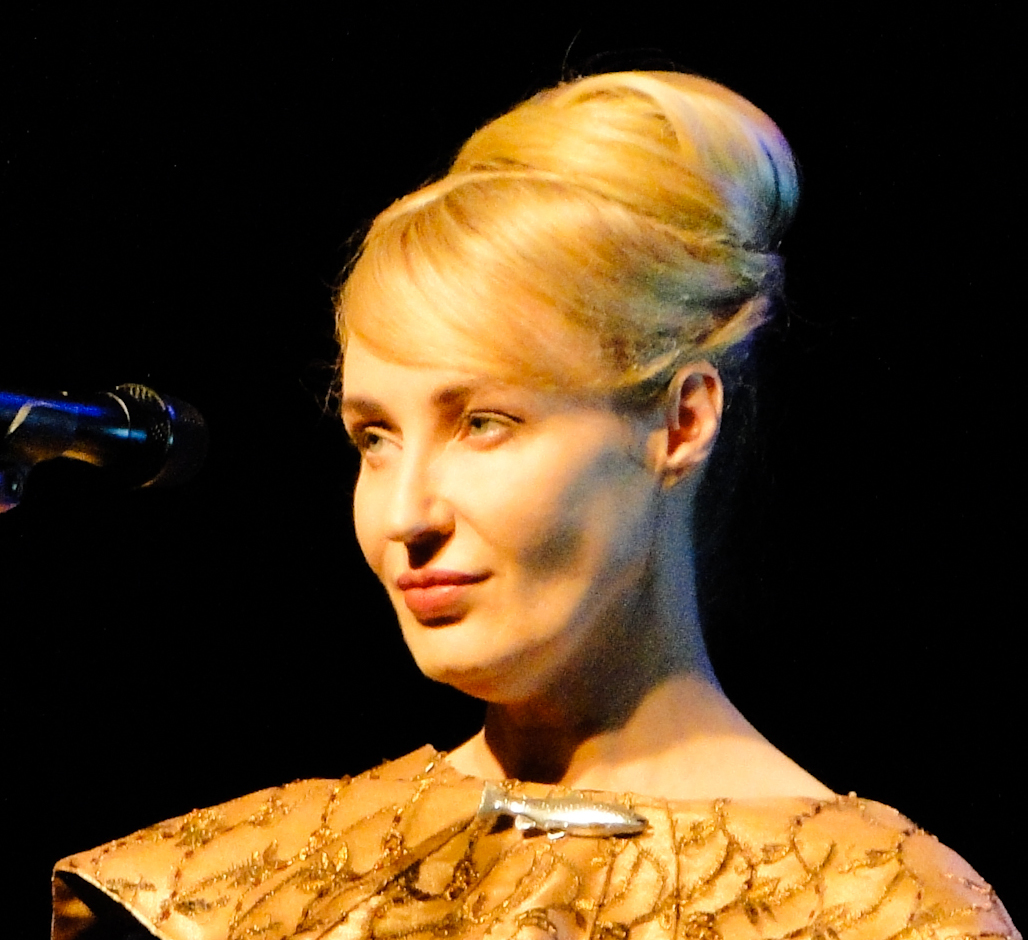
- Gerrard with Dead Can Dance, 2012

Background information
- Born: Lisa Germaine Gerrard; 12 April 1961 (age 65); Melbourne, Victoria, Australia
- Genres: Avant-garde; neoclassical dark wave; new-age; ethereal wave; classical; baroque; gregorian chant; Bulgarian chant; world music
- Occupations: Songwriter; singer; musician
- Instruments: Vocals; yangqin
- Years active: 1980–present
- Labels: Gerrard Records; 4AD; Warner Bros. Records
- Website: lisagerrard.com

Lisa Germaine Gerrard (/dʒəˈrɑːrd/ jə-RARD; born 12 April 1961) is an Australian musician, singer and composer. She is a former (and founder) member of the group Dead Can Dance, which she formed with music partner Brendan Perry. Known for her unique singing style technique (glossolalia), she has a dramatic contralto voice and has a vocal range of three octaves.

Born and raised in Melbourne, Gerrard played a pivotal role in the city's Little Band scene and fronted post-punk group Microfilm before co-founding Dead Can Dance in 1981 (remaining a member until 2022). With Perry, she explored numerous traditional and modern styles, laying the foundations for what became known as neoclassical dark wave. She sings sometimes in English and often in a unique language that she invented. In addition to singing, she is an instrumentalist for much of her work, most prolifically using the yangqin (a Chinese hammered dulcimer). Gerrard's first solo album The Mirror Pool was released in 1995. She has since been involved in a wide range of projects, starting her first collaborative album in 1998 with Pieter Bourke, and later with various artists such as Patrick Cassidy, Klaus Schulze, Hans Zimmer, Ennio Morricone, and Zbigniew Preisner among others. She has scored numerous award-winning motion picture soundtracks.

As of 2020, Gerrard has released four solo albums and collaborated on sixteen albums. She has composed or contributed to the scores of more than 48 films. She received a Golden Globe Award for the music score to the 2000 film Gladiator, on which she collaborated with Hans Zimmer. She wrote the score of Balibo which went on to win an ARIA award for Best Original Soundtrack and an APRA Screen music award for Best feature film score. Overall she has won 11 awards receiving 23 nominations. Gerrard has been nominated for a Grammy Award twice. Gerrard is often affiliated with the "wailing woman" music phenomenon, popularized in Gladiator.

== Early life ==
Lisa Gerrard was born in Melbourne to Irish immigrant parents, and grew up in Prahran, an inner suburb with a substantial Greek population. She recalled growing up with "Mediterranean music blaring out of the houses" and said that this influenced her music, particularly on later Dead Can Dance albums and in her solo and collaborative works.

Gerrard first began forming bands and creating original music as a member of Melbourne's Little Band scene, an experimental post-punk scene which flourished from 1978 until 1981. It was in this scene that she first met Dead Can Dance co-founder Brendan Perry. Perry recalls, "It never occurred to me that we would one day collaborate musically together because at the time I thought her music was too avant-garde. I particularly remember one song that she sang about finding a man in the park and asking her mother if she could bring him home to keep in her wardrobe as she attacked this chinese dulcimer with two bamboo sticks". Around this time, Gerrard became the lead vocalist of Microfilm, which released "Window", and one single, "Centrefold", in 1980, via Unforgettable Music label. The group issued a third song, "Summer House", on Ron Rude's From Belgrave With Love compilation, which was released by Cleopatra Records in 1981.

== Career ==
=== Dead Can Dance ===
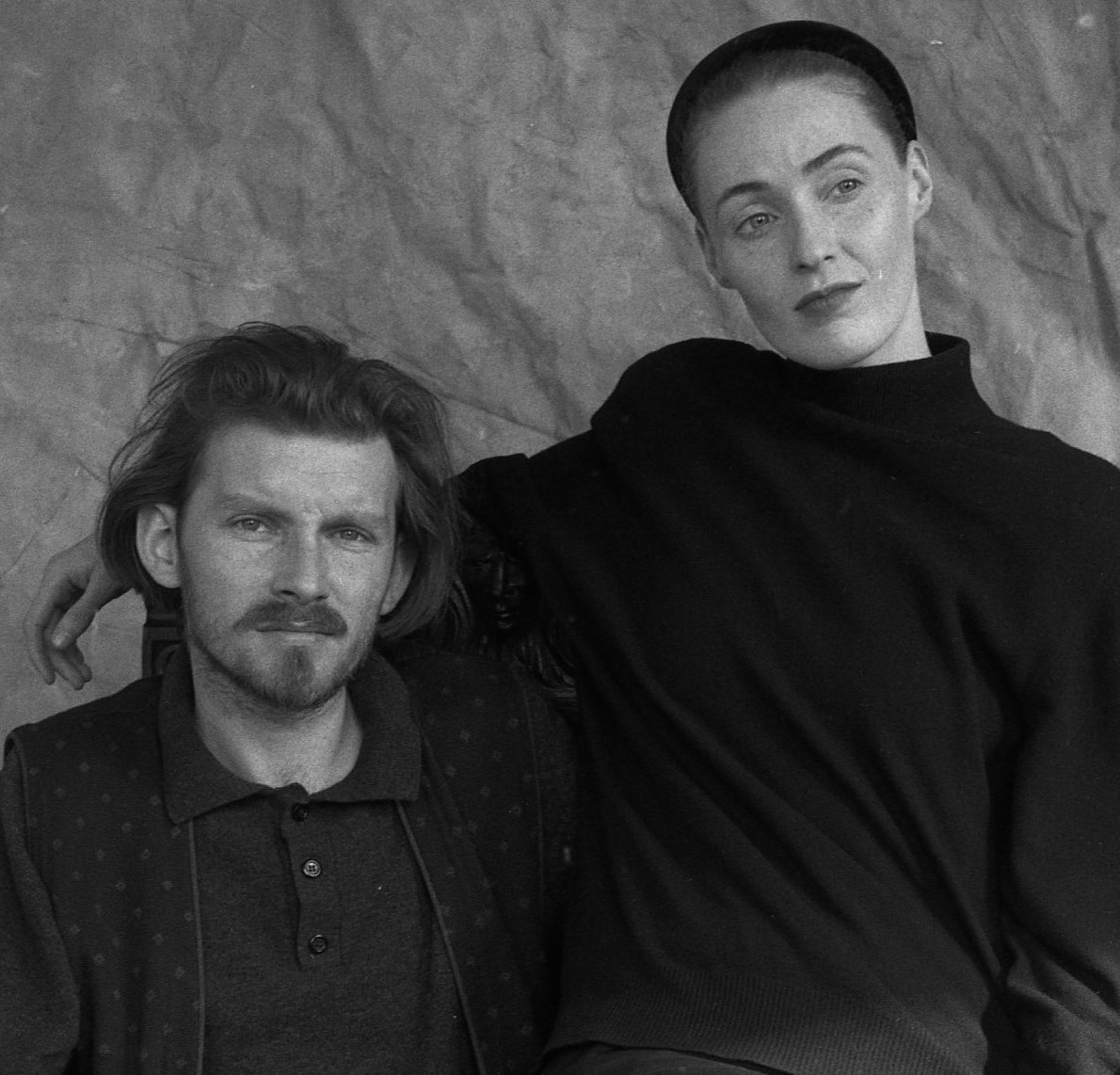
Dead Can Dance c. 1989

Dead Can Dance originally formed as a quartet in 1981 in Melbourne, with members Gerrard, Perry, bassist Paul Erikson, and drummer Simon Monroe. By 1982, Gerrard, Perry and Erikson decided to relocate to London, but Monroe decided to stay in Australia, leaving the band as a trio.

The band split in 1998, but reunited in 2005 for a world tour.

In 2012, the band announced a new world tour to coincide with the release of their new album, Anastasis. Dead Can Dance's albums Spiritchaser (1996) and Anastasis (2012) both reached No. 1 on the Billboard Top World Music Albums Chart.

Dead Can Dance recorded seven studio albums on the 4AD Records recording label—beginning with the self-titled Dead Can Dance LP in 1984, and two studio albums released by PIAS Recordings.

Gerrard departed Dead Can Dance in 2022, leaving Perry to continue the project.

=== Solo and collaborative career ===
In 1995, Gerrard recorded and released her first solo album, The Mirror Pool, accompanied by the Victorian Philharmonic Orchestra. The album peaked at No. 38 on the Billboard Heatseekers Albums Chart on 9 September 1995, and was on that chart for one week.

In 1998 she recorded Duality in collaboration with composer Pieter Bourke. The album went to No. 23 on the Billboard Heatseekers Albums Chart on 2 May 1998; it was present on the chart for two weeks. Duality would mark the beginning of an extensive collaboration for a number of film scores, including The Insider and Ali.

Gerrard began a new collaboration with composer Patrick Cassidy in 2004 with the release of Immortal Memory. Again, this collaboration was furthered in film work, including Salem's Lot.

The following year in 2005, Gerrard contributed to the Ashes and Snow Soundtrack. For the songs "Womb" and "Wisdom", she and Patrick Cassidy wrote and performed together. Her collaboration with Cassidy extended to include work with conductor Julie Rogers on the songs "Devota" and "Vespers".

In 2006, Sanctuary, a documentary about the life and work of Gerrard, was recorded and released in September. It is the work of producer and director Clive Collier and features extensive interviews with Gerrard and various people who have collaborated with her in the past, including Michael Mann, Russell Crowe, Hans Zimmer and Niki Caro. The documentary was released on DVD by Milan Entertainment on 24 April 2007. Sanctuary debuted at the Raindance Film Festival in London, on 27 September 2006. On 20 November 2006, Gerrard released her second solo album, The Silver Tree. The album climbed to No. 4 on the Billboard New Age Albums Chart on 26 May 2007, spending nine weeks on the chart. This album was markedly different from her previous work and was also her first album released outside 4AD Records. The Silver Tree was first released on iTunes, with a wider physical release planned at a future date. The album was nominated for the Australian Music Prize for 2006.

In 2007 a retrospective album, The Best of Lisa Gerrard, a compilation of fifteen songs, was released covering her career in Dead Can Dance, solo work and film work. It was released on 12 February 2007 in the UK and 7 November 2007 in the US. The album peaked at No. 5 on the Billboard New Age albums chart on 16 February 2008 and stayed in the chart for ten weeks. A world tour was undertaken in 2007 beginning in April in Melbourne, Australia. The tour marked the first time that Gerrard toured in Australia, with a performance in three cities. The tour was followed by performances in Europe and North America. More performances took place in Europe and Russia from 30 October to 22 November 2007. In November 2007, Gerrard collaborated with German electronic musician Klaus Schulze on the double-album Farscape. The album was released on 4 July 2008, followed by a European tour, and the release of a DVD, Klaus Schulze featuring Lisa Gerrard: Rheingold, Live at Loreley, recorded during the Night Of The Prog Festival III in Loreley, Germany on the 18 July 2008.

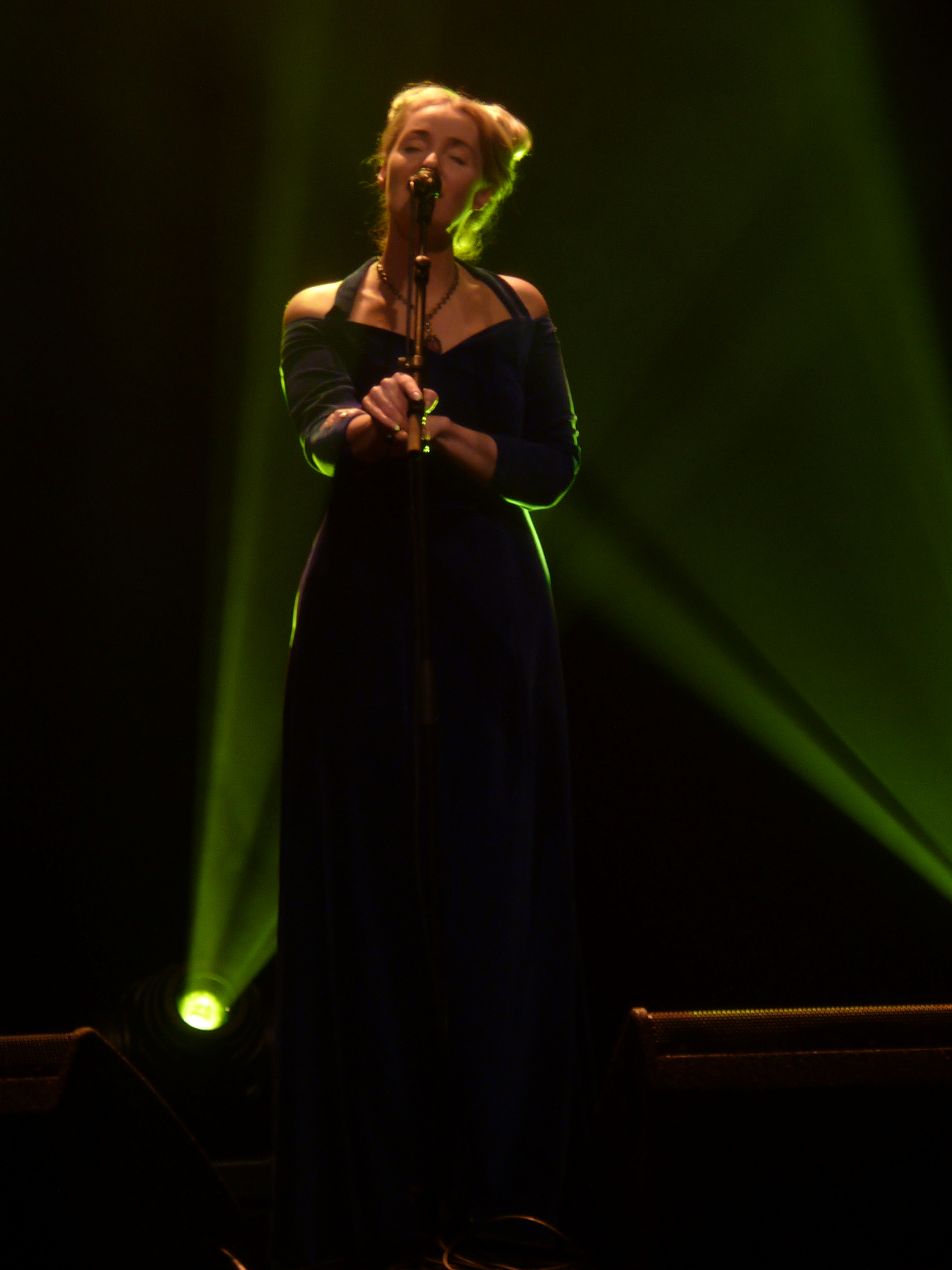
Gerrard performing in Paris, 2009

In 2009, Gerrard completed work on the documentary by Australian adventurer Tim Cope called On the Trail of Genghis Khan and contributed her voice to the soundtrack, which began airing in 2010, of the Japanese NHK taiga drama Ryōmaden, a story based on the life of Sakamoto Ryōma. Furthermore, in 2009, Gerrard created her own record label, Gerrard Records, which, aside from being a conduit for the release of Gerrard's future works, will also act to promote and support unrecognised artists of all genres. This tour coincided with the release of Come Quietly, a joint project between Gerrard and Schulze that was released exclusively during the tour. In September 2009, Gerrard and Schulze performed another tour in six European cities – Warsaw, Berlin, Amsterdam, Essen, Paris, and Brussels. In October 2009, Gerrard released her third solo album, The Black Opal. The album included collaborations with Patrick Cassidy, Michael Edwards, Pieter Bourke and James Orr and was the first release to come from Gerrard Records.

In 2010, Gerrard released a new album entitled Departum from Gerrard Records, with composer Marcello De Francisci, which was followed by the singles "Coming Home" (as featured in Legend of the Guardians: The Owls of Ga'Hoole), "Come This Way" and "Entry". Gerrard also collaborated with multi-instrumentalist Prash Mistry, from UK based live dubstep collective Engine Earz Experiment, on a track titled "Spirit Guide", which appeared on his 2011 album. On 1 December 2010, Gerrard released the soundtrack album with Cye Wood titled The Trail of Genghis Khan which contains music from the Gerrard and Wood score to the documentary TV series by Tim Cope.

In July 2014, Gerrard released a new solo album entitled Twilight Kingdom through her own record label, Gerrard Records. The album was recorded in collaboration with Daniel Johns, Astrid Williamson, Patrick Cassidy, and words by Russell Crowe. The album was on the Billboard New Age Albums Chart for one week, peaking at No. 5 on 6 September 2014. In 2014, Gerrard collaborated with British composer, songwriter and producer, Chicane, on the album The Sum of Its Parts, released on 25 January 2015 by Modena Records.

Gerrard's vocals are featured in the video game Armello launched on 1 September 2015, titled "Wyld's Call"; her vocals feature towards a Celtic theme of the soundtracks, released on 2 September 2015, on the music composed by Michael Allen and Gerrard.

On 14 March 2018, Gerrard performed a concert at the National Palace of Culture in Sofia with Genesis Orchestra, conducted by Yordan Kamdzhalov, entitled Symphony of Sorrowful Songs by Henryk Górecki. During the concert, she also sang her own songs from both her solo career and those of Dead Can Dance. Kamdzhalov said of the event, "for me personally, this is more than a dream come true. I cannot think of a better combination than Gerrard-Gorecki-Kamdzhalov in Gorecki's Symphony of Sorrowful Songs". In 2018, she appeared on BooCheeMish, a collaborative album with the Mystery of Bulgarian Voices, with whom she co-wrote some of the songs. Gerrard emphasized that she—and her collaborators—had striven not to impair the women's essential sound, she said "we're walking toward them, not the other way around"—adding, "if anybody is changed by this, it's me'. The album, that combines the choir's folkloric harmonies and a multitude of instruments, was arranged and produced by Petar Dundakov. Also in 2018, Gerrard teamed with solo percussionist David Kuckhermann to compose and record an album, Hiraeth, released on 6 August 2018.

Hiraeth was nominated in the Best New Age Album category during the 61st Annual Grammy Awards at Staples Center, held on 10 February 2019. Gerrard toured as a special guest with the eighteen choir members of the Mystery of Bulgarian Voices, performing fifteen select dates across Europe from 12 March to 20 October 2019. In 2019, she collaborated again with Yordan Kamdzhalov and Genesis Orchestra, for a reworked and rearranged recording of Henryk Górecki's Symphony No. 3: Symphony of Sorrowful Songs, captured in Sofia at the Bulgarian National Radio Studio, which was released on 17 January 2020.

=== Film career ===
Gerrard's first experience in composing music for a film came with the 1989 Spanish film El Niño de la Luna, directed by Agustí Villaronga. The film score was composed by Dead Can Dance and the film featured Lisa Gerrard in her first acting role. El Niño de la Luna describes the story of David, a young orphan with special powers, escaping an institution with the help of a fellow institute inmate, Georgina, played by Lisa Gerrard.

"Now We Are Free" (2000)
30-second extract from "Now We Are Free" by Hans Zimmer and Lisa Gerrard. Theme from Gladiator.

Gerrard participated in a number of musical scores but came to fame as a film composer after recording The Insider in 1999, with Pieter Bourke, and Gladiator in 2000, with Hans Zimmer, which received an Academy Award nomination for best music score, although only Zimmer was nominated. It did, however, win a Golden Globe Award for both composers. Gerrard's score for the New Zealand independent film Whale Rider consisted entirely of solo material; a soundtrack album was released by 4AD. In 2005, Gerrard collaborated with Ennio Morricone for Fateless, followed by a collaboration with Jeff Rona on the score for the feature film A Thousand Roads and the song '"On an Ocean" for the Henry Poole Is Here score. With Dead Can Dance, she provided several contributions to the soundtrack of Baraka, a visual journey showcasing mankind's impact on the planet. She was invited by Denez Prigent to collaborate with him on his piece "Gortoz a ran – J'attends" (meaning "I await"), a piece that was later used in the soundtrack of Ridley Scott's film Black Hawk Down.

In 2009, Gerrard wrote the score for Balibo, for which she won a Best Feature Film Score award at the 2009 APRA Screen Music Awards and an Aria Award for Best Original Soundtrack/Cast/Show Album at the 2009 Aria Awards. She finished 2009 by contributing her voice to the theme song for the Japanese NHK taiga drama Ryōmaden, which began airing in 2010. That year Gerrard completed the score for Tears of Gaza with Marcello De Francisci which was well received despite its controversial theme. She scored the Jim Loach-directed Oranges and Sunshine, starring Emily Watson and Hugo Weaving, released in April 2011, which gained her another nomination at the 2011 IF Awards for Best Music Score.

In November 2010, Gerrard provided vocals and additional music for the post-apocalyptic sci-fi thriller Priest, scored by Christopher Young, which was released in 2011.

On 28 May 2011, the song "Now We Are Free", part of the Gladiator original soundtrack, composed by Hans Zimmer and Gerrard, peaked at No. 2 on the Billboard 200 and remained in the chart for 460 weeks. In November 2011 Gerrard completed the score for Burning Man, which won her Best Music Score at the 2012 Film Critics Circle of Australia awards, beating scores for Snowtown, The Hunter and Red Dog.

== Vocal ability ==
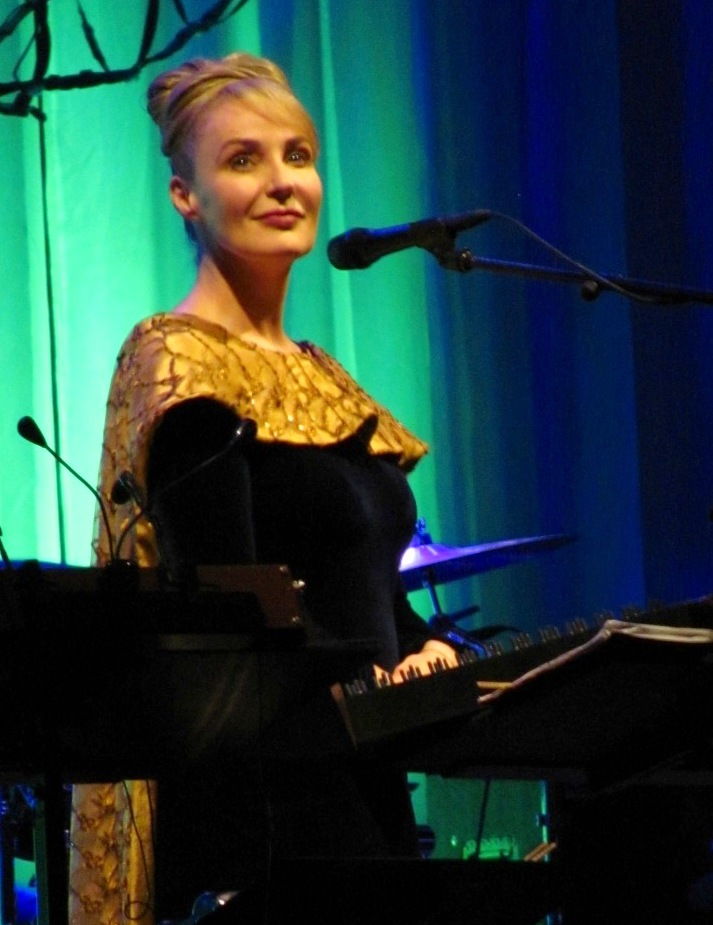
Gerrard at Beacon Theatre, 2012

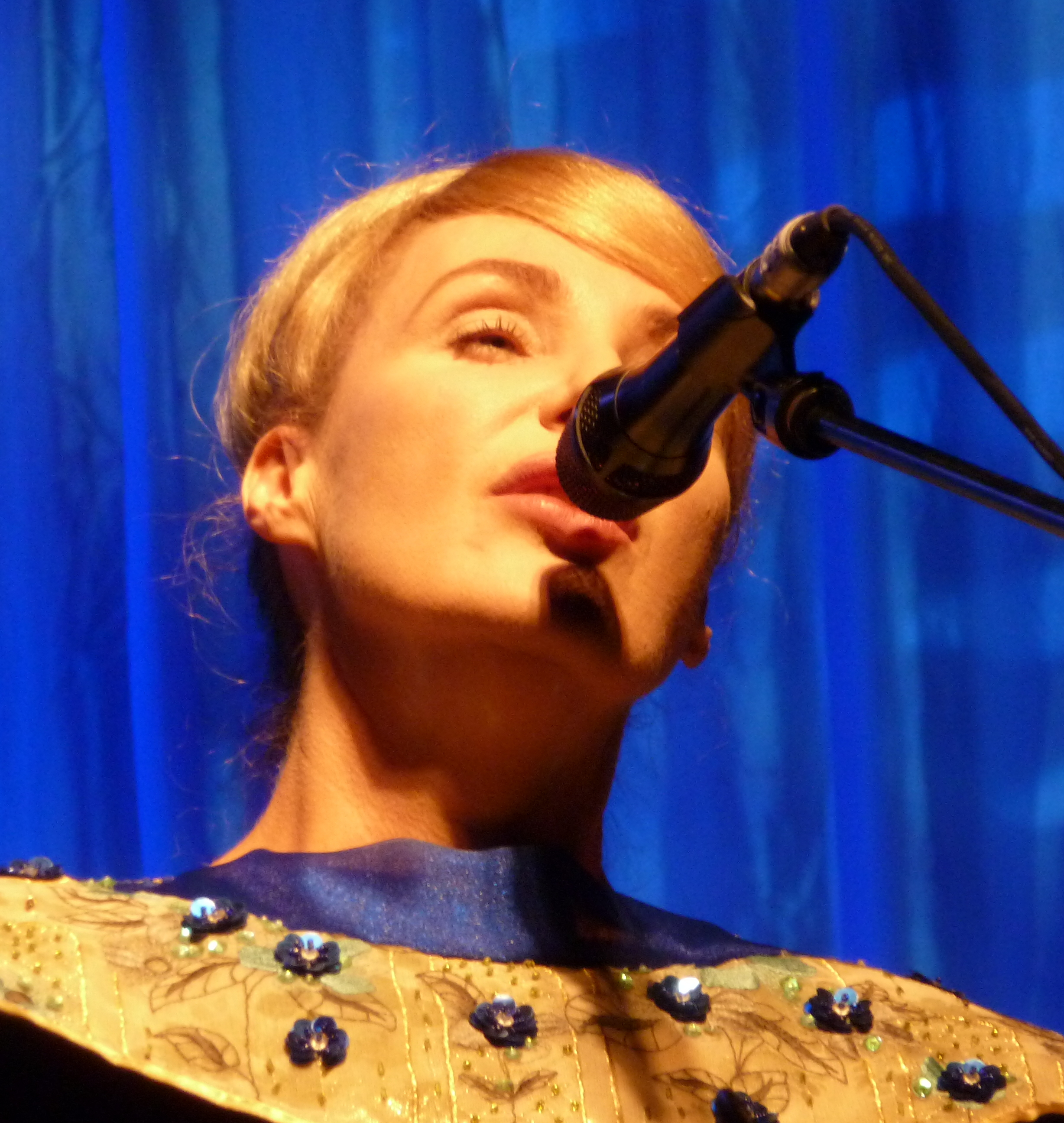
Gerrard during a concert with Dead Can Dance in Paris, June 2013

Gerrard possesses a contralto voice but can reach upward into the mezzo-soprano range. She has a vocal range from A2 to F♯5. Her vocal timbre has been described as "rich, deep" which creates a "mournful sound", and her voice is regarded by critics as "simply not of this world". More predominantly, Gerrard's vocal range spans from contralto to dramatic contralto, displayed for examples in "Sanvean", "Sacrifice", "Largo", and "Not Yet"; — to the dramatic mezzo-soprano voice in her other songs, such as "The Host of Seraphim", "Elegy", "Space Weaver", and "Come this Way".

Jon Pareles of The New York Times said that she uses "distinct voices that drew on far-flung traditions: an opalescent tone from Baroque opera, a reedy hint of Celtic folk style, the sharp and quavering approach of Balkan women's music, blue notes bent like Billie Holiday's...".

Gerrard sings some lyrics in English, but performs many of her songs in a self-created idioglossia, such as "Now We Are Free", "Come Tenderness", "Serenity", "The Valley of the Moon", "Tempest", "Pilgrimage of Lost Children", "Coming Home" and "Sanvean". With respect to such work she has said, "I sing in the language of the Heart. [...] It's an invented language that I've had for a very long time. I believe I started singing in it when I was about 12. Roughly that time. And I believed that I was speaking to God when I sang in that language."

Gerrard's early and formative singing experience was influenced by the Bulgarian choir's technique. Gerrard's influences on the language she sings since her youth has been exerted mainly by the conversations and the music she heard in the Melbourne area where she had grown up, where a large Greco-Turkish community lived. Gerrard's first musical influences came from her father, as she grew up listening to sean-nós songs in an Irish family, and also the "abstract forms" with which Antonin Artaud worked that she heard on radio documentaries.

Gerrard commented in a 2012 interview:

I was very young at the time, but it empowered me to know that there was something really worthwhile about what I was doing. Because I had an artistic soul, this was not something that I could stop or control. You're born with that. It's in your blood. So these influences are coming to the work. It's not traditional Seanos [SIC] singing, but it's my response to the Seanos [SIC] singing in my abstract languages.

== Personal life ==
Lisa Gerrard and her former husband, the late Jacek Tuschewski, have two daughters, Lashna Tuschewski and Teresa Tuschewski. Jacek Tuschewski was an audio director and sound designer for film and games. Gerrard lives in rural Victoria, Australia. She has her own studio in which she produces film music working with composer James Orr.

== Awards and nominations ==
Las Vegas Film Critics Society Awards (Sierra Awards)
Year	Category	Work	Result	Ref.
2000	Best Score	Gladiator	Won	

OFCS Awards
Year	Category	Work	Result	Ref.
2000	Best Original Score	Gladiator	Nominated	

CFCA Award
Year	Category	Work	Result	Ref.
2001	Best Original Score	Gladiator	Nominated	

Satellite Awards
Year	Category	Work	Result	Ref.
2001	Best Original Score	Gladiator	Won	

BAFTA Awards
Year	Category	Work	Result	Ref.
2001	Best Original Music	Gladiator	Nominated	

Saturn Awards
Year	Category	Work	Result	Ref.
2001	Best Music	Gladiator	Nominated	

ASCAP Awards
Year	Category	Work	Result	Ref.
2001	Top Box Office Films	Gladiator	Won	

Golden Globe Awards
Year	Category	Work	Result	Ref.
2000	Best Original Score	The Insider	Nominated	
2001	Best Original Score	Gladiator	Won	
2002	Best Original Score	Ali	Nominated	

Online Film & Television Association (OFTA) Awards
Year	Category	Work	Result	Ref.
2000	Best Original Score	Gladiator	Nominated	
2003	Best Original Score	Whale Rider	Nominated	

NZTV Awards
Year	Category	Work	Result	Ref.
2003	Best Original Music	Whale Rider	Won	

Central Ohio Film Critics Association Awards (COFCA) Awards
Year	Category	Work	Result	Ref.
2004	Best Score	Whale Rider	Nominated	

Primetime Emmy Award
Year	Category	Work	Result	Ref.
2005	Outstanding Music Composition	Salem's Lot	Nominated	

AMP Award
Year	Category	Work	Result	Ref.
2006	Best Australian album	The Silver Tree	Nominated	

ARIA Music Awards
Year	Category	Work	Result	Ref.
1998	Best World Music Album	Duality (with Pieter Bourke)	Nominated	
2001	Best Original Soundtrack Album	Gladiator: Music From the Motion Picture	Nominated	
2009	Best Original Soundtrack Album	Balibo	Won	

AFI Awards
Year	Category	Work	Result	Ref.
2009	Best Original Music Score	Balibo	Nominated	

IF Awards
Year	Category	Work	Result	Ref.
2009	Best Music	Balibo	Nominated	
2011	Best Music	Oranges and Sunshine	Nominated	

IFMCA Awards
Year	Category	Work	Result	Ref.
2004	Best Original Score for Television	Salem's Lot	Nominated	
2012	Best Original Score for a Documentary Film	Samsara	Nominated	

FCCA Awards
Year	Category	Work	Result	Ref.
2004	Best Music Score	One Perfect Day	Won	
2010	Best Music Score	Balibo	Won	
2012	Best Music Score	Burning Man	Won	

APRA Awards
Year	Category	Work	Result	Ref.
2004	Best Music for a Mini-Series or Telemovie	Salem's Lot	Nominated	
2004	Best Soundtrack Album	Salem's Lot	Nominated	
2004	Best Feature Film Score	One Perfect Day	Nominated	
2009	Best Feature Film Score	Balibo	Won	
2012	Feature Film Score of the Year	Burning Man	Won	
2017	Feature Film Score of the Year	2:22	Nominated	

Grammy Awards
Year	Category	Work	Result	Ref.
2001	Best Score Soundtrack Album for Motion Picture	Gladiator: Music From the Motion Picture	Nominated	
2019	Best New Age Album	Hiraeth	Nominated	

== Discography ==
- The Mirror Pool (1995)
- Duality (1998) (with Pieter Bourke)
- The Silver Tree (2006)
- The Black Opal (2009)
- Twilight Kingdom (2014)
- BooCheeMish, collaboration with the Mystery of Bulgarian Voices (2018)
- Hiraeth, Lisa Gerrard & David Kuckhermann (2018)
- Górecki Symphony No. 3: Symphony of Sorrowful Songs, with Genesis Orchestra & Yordan Kamdzhalov (2020)

== Filmography ==
- 1989 – Moon Child
- 1994 – Toward the Within
- 1999 – The Insider
- 2000 – Gladiator
- 2000 – Mission: Impossible 2
- 2001 – Ali
- 2002 – Whale Rider
- 2004 – Layer Cake
- 2004 – Man on Fire
- 2006 – Sanctuary
- 2011 – InSight
- 2015 – Tanna
- 2017 – 2:22
- 2021 – Man of God
- 2021 – Dune
- 2024 – Dune: Part Two
- 2024 - Gladiator II (trailer and song "Now We Are Free").

== Sources ==
- Aston, Martin. Facing the Other Way: The Story of 4AD. London: The Friday Project, 2013. ISBN 978-0-0074-8961-9
