= Megatone =

Megatone may refer to:

- Megatone Records
- Megatone (Richard Wahnfried album), 1984
- Megatone (Boris and Merzbow album), 2002

== See also ==
- Megaton (disambiguation)
