= Michael Shrieve =

American drummer, percussionist, and composer (born 1949)

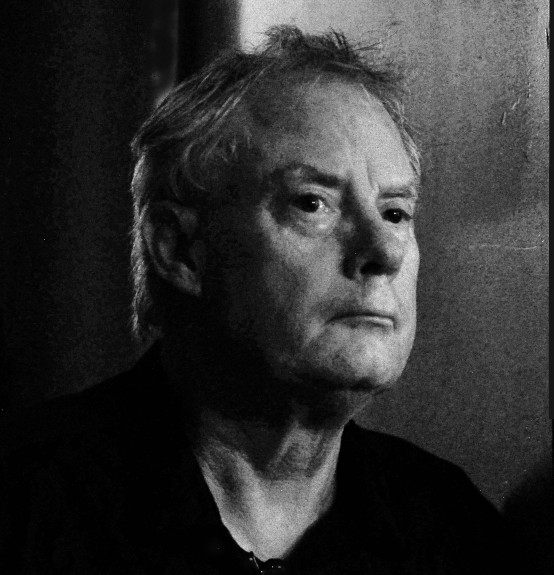
- Shrieve in 2016

Background information
- Born: July 6, 1949 (age 77); Redwood City, California, U.S.
- Genres: Rock; electronic
- Occupation: Musician
- Instruments: Drums; percussion
- Years active: 1965–present
- Formerly of: Santana; Go; Novo Combo; Hagar Schon Aaronson Shrieve

Michael Shrieve (born July 6, 1949) is an American drummer, percussionist, and composer. He is best known as the drummer of the rock band Santana, playing on the band's first seven albums from 1969 to 1974. At age 20, Shrieve was the second youngest musician to perform at Woodstock (after Henry Gross). His drum solo during "Soul Sacrifice" in the Woodstock film has been described as "electrifying", although he considers his solo during the same piece in 1970 at Tanglewood the superior performance.

== Biography ==
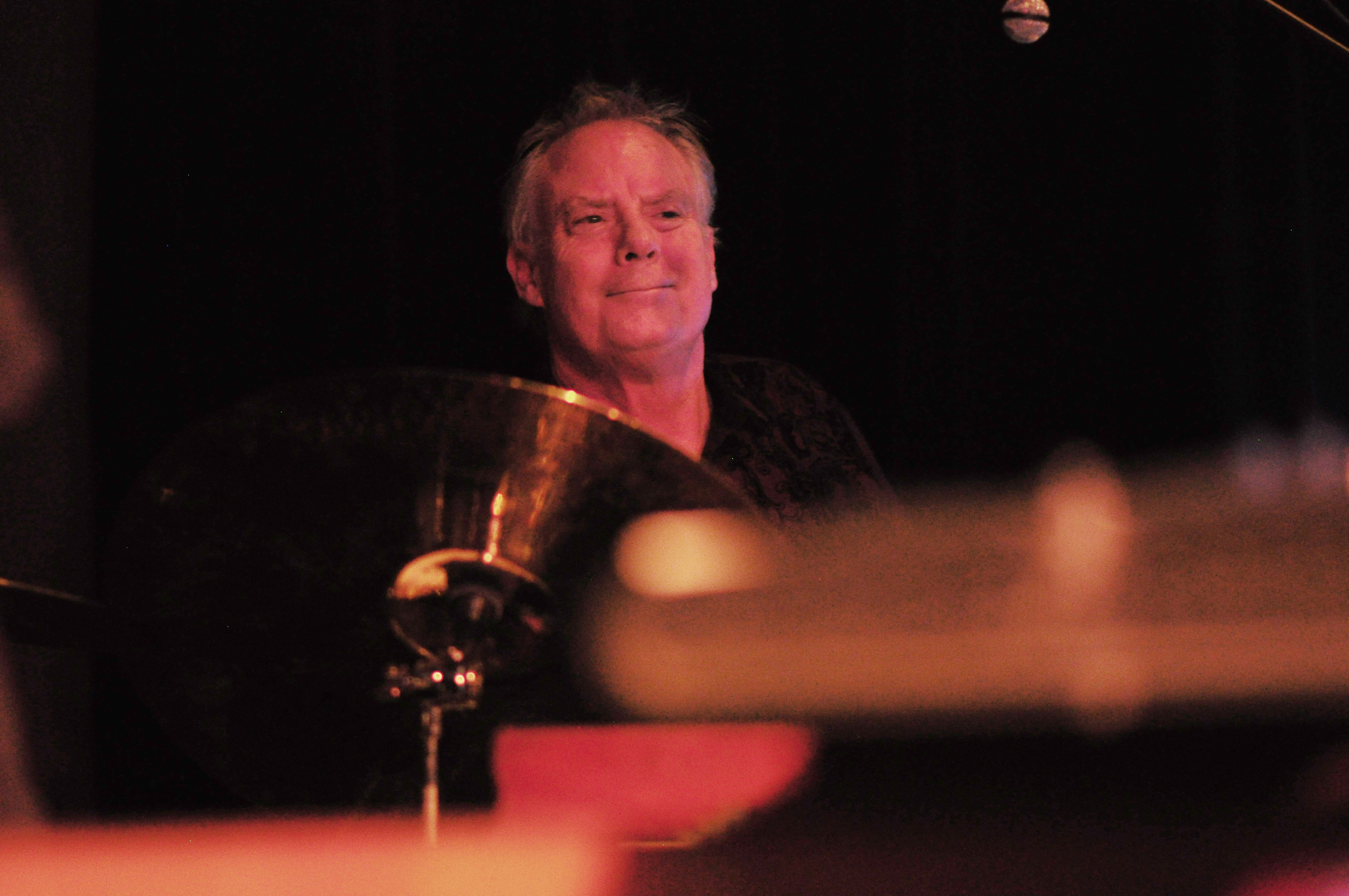
Shrieve playing in 2016 with Wayne Horvitz (not shown).

Shrieve was born and grew up in Redwood City. Shrieve's first full-time band was called Glass Menagerie, followed by experience in the house band of an R&B club, backing touring musicians including B. B. King and Etta James. At 16, Shrieve played in a jam session at the Fillmore Auditorium, where he attracted the attention of Santana's manager, Stan Marcum. When he was 19, Shrieve jammed with Santana at a recording studio and was invited to join that day.

On August 16, 1969, Santana played the Woodstock Festival, shortly after Shrieve's twentieth birthday, but before the release of their eponymous first album (1969). He remained with Santana for Abraxas (1970), Santana III (1971), Caravanserai (1972), Welcome (1973), Borboletta (1974) and the live Lotus (1974). He co-wrote four of the tracks on Caravanserai, as well as co-produced the album.

Shrieve left the original Santana band to pursue solo projects. He moved to London to record the 1976 album Automatic Man with guitarist Pat Thrall, bass guitarist Doni Harvey and keyboardist Todd Cochran (billed as Bayete). While in London Shrieve was part of the fusion supergroup Go with Stomu Yamashta, Steve Winwood, Al Di Meola and Klaus Schulze, releasing two studio albums, Go (1976) and Go Too (1977), and the live album Go Live from Paris (1976).

He played in the band Hagar Schon Aaronson Shrieve (with Sammy Hagar, Neal Schon, and Kenny Aaronson). Later, he played drums on (former Supertramp member) Roger Hodgson's first solo album, In the Eye of the Storm.

From 1979 to 1984, Shrieve collaborated as a percussionist in Richard Wahnfried, a side project of Klaus Schulze (another drummer turned electronic composer) while recording with Schulze his own first "solo" album of electronic music, Transfer Station Blue, in 1984.

Shrieve was also credited for playing percussion on the 1980 album Emotional Rescue by the Rolling Stones and in 1984, he played on Mick Jagger's She's the Boss album. When Jagger, Nile Rodgers and Shrieve were mixing the album at The Power Station in New York City, Jaco Pastorius invited Shrieve for a recording session downstairs. This recording remains unreleased.

In 1997, Shrieve joined former Santana musicians Neal Schon, Gregg Rolie, José "Chepito" Areas, Alphonso Johnson, and Michael Carabello to record Abraxas Pool.

Shrieve has also collaborated with David Beal, Andy Summers, Steve Roach, Jonas Hellborg, Buckethead, Douglas September, Freddie Hubbard and others. He has served as a session player on albums by Todd Rundgren and Jill Sobule.

In 2004, Shrieve appeared on the track "The Modern Divide" on the Revolution Void album Increase the Dosage. The album was released under a Creative Commons license.

As of April 2010, Shrieve lives in Seattle, Washington, where he plays in a fusion jazz group, Spellbinder, with Danny Godinez, Joe Doria, Raymond Larsen, and Farko Dosumov.

Shrieve has composed music for several films, including Paul Mazursky's Tempest and Apollo 13.

Shrieve currently plays a DW Collector's Series drum set and recently joined the Istanbul Agop cymbals family. He has played a variety of other drum sets in the past, including sets by Camco, Premier and Ludwig, the latter visible in the Woodstock footage. He also played both Zildjian and later Paiste cymbals in his early days before becoming a longtime Sabian user.

== Honors ==
In 1998 Shrieve was inducted into the Rock & Roll Hall of Fame for his work with Santana.

In March 2011, Rolling Stone magazine readers picked The Best Drummers of All Time: Shrieve ranked No. 10.

== Discography ==
=== Drummer ===
(This is a partial discography.)

- (1969) with Santana — Santana
- (1970) with Santana — Abraxas
- (1971) with Santana — Santana III
- (1972) with Santana — Caravanserai
- (1973) with Santana — Love Devotion Surrender
- (1973) with Santana — Welcome
- (1974) with Santana — Borboletta
- (1976) with Automatic Man — Automatic Man
- (1976) with Go/Stomu Yamashta — Go
- (1979) with Richard Wahnfried — Time Actor (percussion)
- (1980) with Pat Travers Band — Crash and Burn (percussion)
- (1981) with Klaus Schulze - Trancefer (percussion)
- (1981) with Novo Combo — Novo Combo
- (1981) with Richard Wahnfried — Tonwelle
- (1982) with Novo Combo — Animation Generation
- (1983) with Klaus Schulze - Audentity (EEH Computer/Simmons Drums)
- (1984) with Richard Wahnfried — Megatone (percussion)
- (1984) with Hagar Schon Aaronson Shrieve (HSAS) — Through the Fire
- (1984) with Roger Hodgson — In the Eye of the Storm
- (1988) with Steve Roach — The Leaving Time
- (1989) with Freddie Hubbard - Times Are Changing
- (1993) with Jonas Hellborg and Buckethead — Octave of the Holy Innocents
- (1995) with Shawn Lane, Jonas Hellborg, Bill Frisell & Wayne Horovitz — Two Doors
- (1997) with ex-Santana members — Abraxas Pool
- (2004) with Revolution Void — Increase the Dosage (one track)
- (2016) with Santana — Santana IV

=== Composer ===
- (1971) If I Could Only Remember My Name (David Crosby, one track)
- (1984) Transfer Station Blue (with Kevin Shrieve & Klaus Schulze, recorded 1979–83)
- (1986) In Suspect Terrain (EMC 8100)
- (1988) The Leaving Time (with Steve Roach)
- (1989) Big Picture (with David Beal)
- (1989) Stiletto (with Mark Isham, David Torn, Andy Summers, & Terje Gewelt)
- (1994) Fascination (with Bill Frisell & Wayne Horvitz)
- (1995) Two Doors (Door 1 with Jonas Hellborg & Shawn Lane) (Door 2 with Bill Frisell & Wayne Horvitz)
- (2005) Oracle (with Amon Tobin) Available only on iTunes
- (2006) Drums of Compassion (with Jeff Greinke, Jack DeJohnette, Zakir Hussain, & Airto Moreira)

=== Producer ===
- (1998) Douglas September — Ten Bulls (producer)
- (2007) AriSawkaDoria — Chapter One (coproducer)
- (2009) Sam Shrieve — "Bittersweet Lullabies" (producer)

== Filmography ==
Shrieve makes a very brief appearance in the film Gimme Shelter (1970), explaining the scenes of violence that occurred at the Altamont free concert to Jerry Garcia and Phil Lesh.

Shrieve appeared in the 1970 documentary called Woodstock: The Director’s Cut, performing a drum solo during Santana's performance of “Soul Sacrifice.”
