= The Bigger Picture =

The Bigger Picture may refer to:

- The Bigger Picture (film), a 2014 British short film
- "The Bigger Picture" (song), a 2020 song by Lil Baby

See also:

- Bigger Picture, an American Thoroughbred racehorse
- Bigger Picture Music Group, a former independent record label
- David Hockney: A Bigger Picture, an exhibition at the Guggenheim Museum Bilbao
- Graham Norton's Bigger Picture, former British comedy panel chat show broadcast on BBC One
- The Big Picture (disambigutation)
