= Tonwelle =

Studio album by Richard Wahnfried
- Released: 1 March 1981
- Recorded: 1981
- Genre: Electronic music, rock, space music, trance music
- Length: 35:25
- Label: Innovative Communication
- Producer: Klaus Schulze

Richard Wahnfried chronology
Time Actor (1979)	Tonwelle (1981)	Megatone (1984)

Professional ratings
Review scores
Source	Rating
Allmusic	4/5 stars

Tonwelle is the second album by Klaus Schulze released under the name of Richard Wahnfried. It was originally released in 1981, and was not reissued by Revisited Records as part of the overall reissue program of Schulze albums. A two-disc reissue was released in January 2012 by MIG Music, featuring different speeds from the original recording.

== Track listing ==
All tracks composed by Klaus Schulze.

No.	Title	Length
1.	"Schwung"	17:05
2.	"Druck"	18:20

== Personnel ==
- Klaus Schulze – synths
- Manuel Göttsching – guitar
- Karl Wahnfried – guitar
- Michael Shrieve – drums
- Michael Garvens – vocals
