= The Big Picture =

The Big Picture may refer to:

== Music ==
- The Big Picture (Michael W. Smith album), a 1986 album
- The Big Picture (Michael Shrieve album), a 1988 collaborative album by Michael Shrieve and David Beal
- The Big Picture (Elton John album), a 1997 album
- The Big Picture (Big L album), a 2000 album
- The Big Picture (Rob Brown album), a 2004 album by jazz saxophonist Rob Brown
- The Big Picture (Bap Kennedy album), a 2005 album
- The Big Picture (The Salads album), a 2006 album
- The Big Picture (Da' T.R.U.T.H. album), a 2009 album
- The Big Picture (Fred Frith and ARTE Quartett album), a 2009 album
- "The Big Picture" (song), a 1988 single by Y Kant Tori Read
- "Big Picture" (London Grammar song), a 2017 song
- "The Big Picture", a song by Devo from the 1990 album, Smooth Noodle Maps
- "The Big Picture", a song from the 1992 self-titled album, King's X
- "The Big Picture", a song by Bright Eyes from the 2002 album, Lifted or The Story Is in the Soil, Keep Your Ear to the Ground
- "Big Picture", a song by Loverboy from the 1997 album Six

== Film and television ==
- The Big Picture (1989 film), a 1989 American comedy film
- The Big Picture (2000 film), a short film directed by Michael and Peter Spierig
- The Big Picture (2010 film) (L'Homme qui voulait vivre sa vie), a 2010 French feature film
- The Big Picture (American TV series), a 1951–1964 documentary series
- The Big Picture (Indian TV series), an Indian game show
- The Big Picture with Avi Lewis, a Canadian television program hosted by Avi Lewis
- The Big Picture with Kal Penn, 2015 American documentary TV series
- "The Big Picture" (Foster's Home for Imaginary Friends), a 2006 episode of Foster's Home for Imaginary Friends
- "The Big Picture", a recurring segment during the 1980s on Saturday Night Live's Weekend Update by A. Whitney Brown
- Big Picture (web series), a 2018 South Korean web television series

== Other uses ==
- Big Picture (magazine), a magazine by the Wellcome Trust
- The Big Picture (painting), a 1903 painting by Tom Roberts, formally known as The Opening of the First Parliament of the Commonwealth of Australia by H.R.H. The Duke of Cornwall and York (later H.M. King George V), May 9, 1901
- The Big Picture, a 1997 novel by Douglas Kennedy
- The Big Picture Art Exhibition, UAE
- The Big Picture (Carroll book), a 2016 book by Sean M. Carroll
- The Big Picture: Who Killed Hollywood? and Other Essays, a 2000 book by William Goldman
- The Big Picture, a blog by finance writer Barry Ritholtz
- Steam Big Picture, a game console interface for Steam for use on large screens
- The Big Picture: The New Logic of Money and Power in Hollywood, a 2005 book by Edward Jay Epstein

== See also ==
- Big History, academic discipline examining history from the Big Bang to the present
- Construal level theory
