= Beyond Recall =

Studio album by Klaus Schulze
- Released: 24 June 1991
- Recorded: August–September 1990
- Genre: Electronic music, new-age, modern classical, ambient
- Length: 77:07 (CD & MC); 49:58 (LP)
- Label: Venture (Virgin)
- Producer: Klaus Schulze

Klaus Schulze chronology
The Dresden Performance (1990)	Beyond Recall (1991)	Royal Festival Hall Vol. 1 (1992)

Klaus Schulze studio album chronology
Miditerranean Pads (1990)	Beyond Recall (1991)	Klaus Schulze Goes Classic (1994)

Professional ratings
Review scores
Source	Rating
Allmusic	link

Beyond Recall is the twenty-third album by German electronic music pioneer Klaus Schulze, released in June 1991 by Virgin Records' subsidiary label Venture Records. This is the second of seven early-1990s Klaus Schulze albums not to be reissued by Revisited Records.

The album marked the beginning of Schulze's "sample" period, in which his albums mostly made use of pre-recorded sounds, amongst of which included animal growls, screeching birds and female voices. Sampling was phased out with his 1995 album In Blue.

== Track listing ==
All tracks composed by Klaus Schulze.

No.	Title	Note	Length
1.	"Gringo Nero"	On original release; omitted from vinyl editions due to space constraints	27:04
2.	"Trancess"	On original release	12:48
3.	"Brave Old Sequence"	On original release	11:00
4.	"The Big Fall"	On original release	11:25
5.	"Airlight"	On original release	14:46
Total length:			77:07; 49:58 (LP)

== Personnel ==
- Klaus Schulze - synthesizers, keyboards, sampler, drum programming, arrangement and production
- Fredi Palm - studio maintenance
- Werner Eggert - sound sampling
- Charly Höhr - hardware coordination
- Peeti Unglaub - cover illustration

== Release history ==
Year	Label	Format	Catalog number
1991	Venture (Virgin)	LP	VE 906
1991	Venture (Virgin)	CD	CDVE 906
1991	Venture (Virgin)	MC	TCVGD 906
1992	Caroline	CD	CAROL 1873-2
