= Rites of Passage (Roger Hodgson album) =

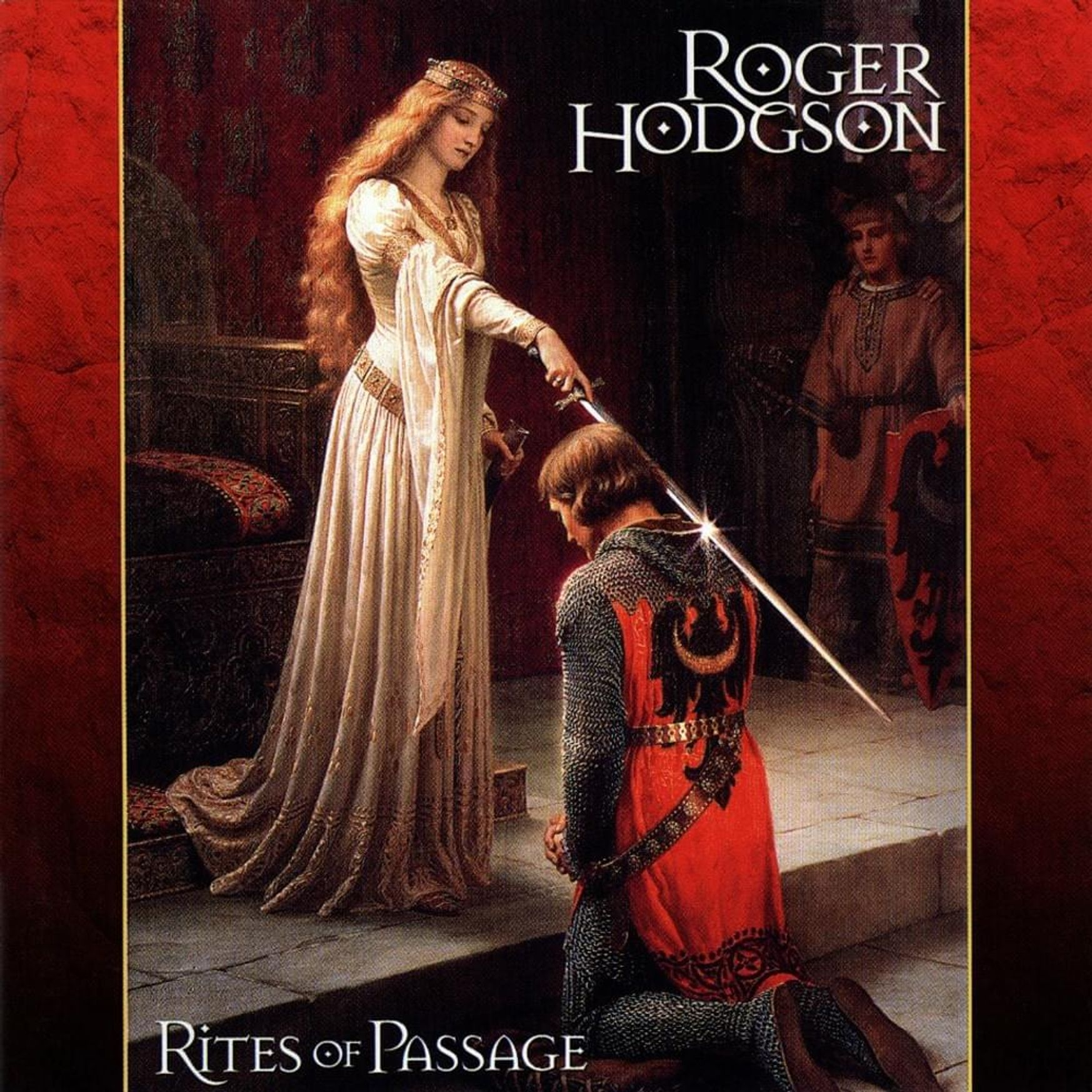

Live album by Roger Hodgson
- Released: 1997
- Recorded: 2 August 1996
- Venue: Miners Foundry (Nevada City, California)
- Genre: Progressive rock
- Length: 60:28
- Label: Unichord / Voiceprint
- Producer: Karuna Hodgson

Roger Hodgson chronology
Hai Hai (1987)	Rites of Passage (1997)	Open the Door (2000)

Singles from Rites of Passage
- 1. "Every Trick in the Book" Released: 1997

Rites of Passage is the third album by Roger Hodgson, recorded in August 1996 near Hodgson's home in Nevada City, California and his first live album. It was the last gig of several Californian dates in the summer of 1996.

== Overview ==
The album features three Supertramp hits, six songs by Hodgson (five previously unrecorded), two songs written and performed as lead vocalist by Mikail Graham and one song written and performed as lead vocalist by Hodgson's son Andrew.

One of Hodgson's new songs, Showdown, later appeared in a more elaborate version on his studio album Open the Door.

The album was notable for featuring Supertramp member John Helliwell playing on all songs (except Andrew's solo performance), which was a rare exception given that there wasn't much contact between Roger Hodgson and Supertramp members after his split from the band.

The album cover features the 1901 painting The Accolade by Edmund Blair Leighton.

== Track listing ==
No.	Title	Writer(s)	Length
1.	"Every Trick in the Book"	Roger Hodgson	5:54
2.	"In Jeopardy"	R. Hodgson	5:13
3.	"Showdown"	R. Hodgson	4:45
4.	"Don't You Want to Get High"	R. Hodgson	4:07
5.	"Take the Long Way Home"	R. Hodgson, Rick Davies	4:28
6.	"Red Lake"	R. Hodgson	5:14
7.	"Melancholic"	Andrew Hodgson	4:31
8.	"Time Waits for No One"	R. Hodgson	9:07
9.	"No Colours"	Mikail Graham	4:24
10.	"The Logical Song"	R. Hodgson, R. Davies	3:47
11.	"Smelly Feat"	M. Graham	6:02
12.	"Give a Little Bit"	R. Hodgson, R. Davies	4:17

== Personnel ==
=== Musicians ===
- Roger Hodgson – lead vocals (1–6, 8, 10, 12), guitar (9, 11), piano (2, 3, 5, 10), twelve-string guitar (1, 4, 6, 8, 12)
- Andrew Hodgson – drums (1–6, 9–12), lead vocals (7), piano (7), percussion (8), didgeridoo (8), harmonica (9)
- John Helliwell – saxophone (1, 2, 5, 6, 8, 10–12), percussion (3), backing vocals (2–6, 10)
- Mikail Graham – guitar (1–4, 6, 8–12), lead vocals (9, 11), backing vocals (1–6, 10, 12), keyboards (5, 8), percussion (5, 8), harmonica (5)
- Rich Stanmyre – bass (1–6, 8–12), backing vocals (1–6, 11, 12)
- Jeff Daniel – keyboards (1–6, 8–10, 12), Hammond organ (1–6, 10, 11, 12), percussion (3, 6, 8–11), backing vocals (1–6, 10, 12)
- Terry Riley – tambura (8), backing vocals (8)
- Josh Neumann – cello (7)
- Ian "Biggles" Lloyd-Bisley – noises (1)

=== Technicians ===
- Biff Dawes – live recording engineer
- Harry Andronis – live sound engineer
- Tony Shepherd – lighting direction, video direction
- Joe Gastwirt – mastering
- Ramón Bretón – mastering assistant
- Brian Foraker – mixing engineer
- Karuna Hodgson – production
- Ian "Biggles" Lloyd-Bisley – stage production manager, monitor engineer
- Dave Morrison – assistant stage manager

=== Artwork ===
- Daniel Clark – art direction, design
- Cole Thompson – photography
- Sunja Park – typography, layout
- Karuna Hodgson – liner notes

== Production details ==
- mixed at Unicorn Studio
- recorded on the Westwood One mobile recording truck, 2 August 1996, Miners Foundry, Nevada City, California
- live sound by Delicate Productions
- mastered at Oceanview Digital Mastering

== Charts ==
Chart (1997)	Peak position
German Albums (Offizielle Top 100)	34
Swiss Albums (Schweizer Hitparade)	46
