= Trancefer =

Studio album by Klaus Schulze
- Released: 1 October 1981
- Recorded: 1981
- Genre: Electronic music, space music, Berlin School
- Length: 37:23 (original); 74:41 (reissue)
- Label: Innovative Communication
- Producer: Klaus Schulze

Klaus Schulze chronology
Dig It (1980)	Trancefer (1981)	Audentity (1983)

Professional ratings
Review scores
Source	Rating
Allmusic	4/5 stars

Trancefer is the fourteenth album by Klaus Schulze. It was originally released in 1981, and in 2006 was the twenty-third Schulze album reissued by Revisited Records. With the original total running time of 37 minutes and 23 seconds, it was the shortest album in Schulze's canon until the 2006 reissue doubled its running time by including alternate versions of the main tracks.

== Overview ==
Trancefer features strong performances by Wolfgang Tiepold on cello and Michael Shrieve on percussion. Although it was his second album recorded with digital instruments, and has a great deal of treble, it is an example of the Berlin School genre which developed in the 1970s. The second track, "Silent Running", was inspired by the science fiction film Silent Running starring Bruce Dern. This was the third Schulze piece to be inspired by science fiction, following "Dune" (from Dune, 1979) and "The Andromeda Strain" (1976; first collected on Historic Edition, 1995).

Trancefer is quite distinctive in its sound and arrangements. It is quite different from what Schulze was doing in the 1970s in the sense that it is not a composition that uses sequencers, transpositions, and a main melody line. Trancefer is more syncopated, and here the main focus is put on the dialog between the percussion and the chords Schulze is playing on the Yamaha CS-80 synthesizer.

Two pre-release versions of Trancefer were produced as test pressings before the release of the album. The first, limited to 300 copies, was cut at 45 RPM (the "normal cut"), and the other, limited to 500 copies, plays at 33 RPM and was half-speed mastered (the "halfspeed cut"). The mixes on both versions are different than the released versions. One track from each test cut was included on the 2006 Revisited reissue.

== Track listing ==
All tracks composed by Klaus Schulze.

Side one
No.	Title	Length
1.	"A Few Minutes After Trancefer"	18:20

Side two
No.	Title	Length
1.	"Silent Running"	18:57

Deluxe edition bonus tracks
No.	Title	Note	Length
3.	"A Few Minutes After Trancefer (Version 33 Halfspeed)"	alternate version from the "halfspeed cut" test pressing	18:17
4.	"Silent Running (Version 45)"	alternate version from the "normal cut" test pressing	19:07
