= Drive-in (disambiguation) =

Drive-in is a facility where one can literally drive in with an automobile for service.

Drive-in may also refer to:

- Drive-in theater, a form of cinema structure
- Drive-in bank, a form of bank structure
- Drive In (TV program), an Italian television variety show aired from 1983 to 1989
- Drive-In (film), a 1976 American comedy film directed by Rod Amateau
- Drive In (That '70s Show episode), a first-season episode of the TV series That '70s Show
- "Drive-In" (song), a song by The Beach Boys
- Drive Inn (album), a 1984 album by Klaus Schulze and Rainer Bloss
- Drive In (TV series), Thames Television series from the 1970s to the 1980s in the UK
