= Rainer Bloss =

German musician

- Born: 1946; Saxony, Germany
- Died: 10 December 2015 (aged 68–69)
- Genres: Electronic music
- Occupation: Musician
- Years active: 1981–2015

Rainer Bloss (also spelled as Rainer Blos or Rainer Bloß; 1946 – 10 December 2015) was a German electronic musician. He collaborated with electronic composer Klaus Schulze during 1980s to produce several albums, including Audentity (1981), Aphrica (1984), and Drive Inn (1984).

== Discography ==
Year	Title
1982	Traum–Töters Knecht
1983	Audentity with Klaus Schulze
1983	Dziekuje Poland Live '83 with Klaus Schulze
1984	Aphrica with Ernst Fuchs and Klaus Schulze
1984	Drive Inn with Klaus Schulze
1984	Ampsy – A Mythodigital Fairytale of a Kinky Computer
1986	Drive Inn 2
1998	Drive Inn III
