= Time Actor =

Studio album by Richard Wahnfried
- Released: August 1979
- Recorded: 1979
- Genre: Electronic music, space music, trance music, Berlin School
- Length: 57:24
- Label: Innovative Communication
- Producer: Klaus Schulze

Richard Wahnfried chronology
Time Actor (1979)	Tonwelle (1981)

Professional ratings
Review scores
Source	Rating
Allmusic	4/5 stars

Time Actor is the first album by Klaus Schulze released under the name of Richard Wahnfried. It was originally released in 1979, and was recorded in collaboration with English singer and songwriter Arthur Brown. A reissue was released in July 2011 by Esoteric Records.

== Track listing ==
All tracks are written by Richard Wahnfried and Arthur Brown, except where noted.

Side one
No.	Title	Writer(s)	Length
1.	"Time Actor"		8:58
2.	"Time Factory"		10:39
3.	"Charming the Wind"		4:48
4.	"Grandma's Clockwork"	Richard Wahnfried	4:08

Side two
No.	Title	Length
5.	"Distorted Emission 1"	5:29
6.	"The Silent Sound of the Ground"	15:02
7.	"Time Echoes"	8:20

== Personnel ==
- Klaus Schulze – synths
- Arthur Brown – vocals
- Vincent Crane – keyboards
- Wolfgang Tiepold – cello
- Michael Shrieve – percussion
