= Go (band) =

Japanese rock supergroup (1976–1978)

- Also known as: Stomu Yamashita's Go
- Origin: Kyoto, Japan
- Genres: Progressive rock; jazz
- Years active: 1976–1978
- Labels: Island; Arista
- Past members: Stomu Yamashta; Steve Winwood; Al Di Meola; Klaus Schulze; Michael Shrieve; Ava Cherry

Go was a Japanese rock supergroup formed in 1976 by Stomu Yamashta (percussion and keyboards), which included Steve Winwood (vocals and keyboards), Al Di Meola (lead guitar), Klaus Schulze (synthesizers) and Michael Shrieve (drums). Go is the Japanese word for "five".

Go recorded two studio albums, a self-titled effort (1976) and Go Too (1977). The band also recorded the 12 June 1976 concert they performed in France, which was released as the album Go: Live from Paris (1976).

== Discography ==
1976	Go	Full-length
1976	Go Live from Paris	Live
1977	Go Too	Full-length
