= The Runner (1999 film) =

- Directed by: Ron Moler
- Written by: Anthony E. Zuiker
- Story by: Dustin Lee Abraham
- Produced by: Ron Moler; Wayne Allan Rice
- Starring: Ron Eldard; Courteney Cox; John Goodman; Joe Mantegna; Bokeem Woodbine
- Cinematography: James Glennon
- Edited by: Gene M. Gamache; Paul Heiman
- Music by: Anthony Marinelli
- Release date: August 1, 1999
- Running time: 94 minutes
- Country: United States
- Language: English

The Runner is a 1999 crime thriller film directed by Ron Moler, and starring Ron Eldard and Courteney Cox.

The soundtrack contains songs performed by Nick Cave and the Bad Seeds and Douglas September.

== Plot ==
A young man with a gambling gets into serious debt by losing all his money. To pay off the bookies, his uncle pulls a few strings and gets him a job working for a gangster named Deepthroat, who needs a "runner" to place bets with bookies. The gangster keeps his new runner on a short leash and, for the most part, the young gambler behaves himself. However, the temptation of walking around with large sums of cash proves too great, and the runner puts his job and his survival on the line when he dips into his boss' funds to buy a ring for his girlfriend.

== Cast ==
- Ron Eldard as Edward
- Courteney Cox as Karina
- John Goodman as Deepthroat
- Joe Mantegna as Rocco
- Bokeem Woodbine as 477
- Terrence Evans as Lefty

== Production ==
The Runner was initially intended to be a large budget that would serve as Moler's directorial debut. While Zuiker was shopping the script around a production company offered to fund the film if Moler stepped down as director. This offer was refused and The Runner was filmed as an independent film.

== Release ==
The Runner was released direct to video in 1999.

== Reception ==
The film received reviews from The Boston Globe and Variety.
