= Revolution Void =

American electronic jazz music project

Revolution Void is an electronic jazz music project by Jonah Dempcy. Revolution Void's recordings have included collaborations with Lucas Pickford, Cochemea Gastelum, Michael Shrieve, Seamus Blake and Matthew Garrison. The music of Revolution Void has been released through the Creative Commons.

The sound of Revolution Void has been described as an eclectic mix of genres that is difficult to classify, as in this review by Matt Borghi for Allmusic:

"The Revolution Void recording shows a blend of sounds that defy genre specification, coming together and becoming quite cohesive. This is a very eclectic recording and one that certainly rewards the listener with a palette for new and intriguing sound."

Additionally, Cheshire Records is a netlabel run by Dempcy in Seattle, Washington, which focuses on nu-jazz, downtempo and instrumental hiphop.

== Discography ==
- Viva la Revolucion EP (September 25, 1999)
- Like a Secret Dream (July 25, 2000)
- Increase the Dosage (April 4, 2004)
- Thread Soul (August 21, 2006)
- The Politics of Desire (June 24, 2008)
- Let 1,000 Flowers Bloom (July 15, 2011)
- Nightmusic (March 12, 2017)
