= The Dome Event =

Live album by Klaus Schulze
- Released: March 1993
- Recorded: May 11, 1991 & 1992
- Genre: Electronic music, space music
- Length: 74:18
- Label: Virgin
- Producer: Klaus Schulze

Klaus Schulze chronology
Royal Festival Hall Vol. 2 (1992)	The Dome Event (1993)	Le Moulin de Daudet (1994)

Professional ratings
Review scores
Source	Rating
Allmusic	3/5 stars

The Dome Event is the twenty-sixth album by Klaus Schulze. It was originally released in 1993. This is the fifth of seven early-1990s Klaus Schulze albums not to be reissued by Revisited Records.

Although released in 1993, The Dome Event is a live concert that was played on May 11, 1991, in Germany at the Cologne Cathedral, also called "The Dome". Other musicians were playing that day, including Ash Ra and Blue Chip Orchestra. The album belongs to the "sampling" period of Schulze's. The beginning of the concert can be seen as a collage of samples, especially "ethnical" voices, percussions, instruments. The rest of the concert relies a lot on samples. "After Eleven" was composed in the studio, and is not a piece played during the concert.

== Track listing ==
All tracks composed by Klaus Schulze.

No.	Title	Length
1.	"The Dome Event"	63:31
2.	"After Eleven"	10:44
