= Stomu Yamashta =

Japanese percussionist, keyboardist and composer (born 1947)

Stomu Yamashta (or Yamash'ta), born Tsutomu Yamashita (山下勉, Yamashita Tsutomu; 15 March 1947), is a Japanese percussionist, keyboardist and composer. He is best known for pioneering and popularising a fusion of traditional Japanese percussive music with Western progressive rock music in the 1960s and 1970s.

In the latter part of the 1970s, he led the supergroup Go with Steve Winwood, Al Di Meola, Klaus Schulze, and Michael Shrieve.

== Biography ==
Yamash'ta was born in Kyoto, Japan on 15 March 1947. He entered to study at the Kyoto Academy of Music in 1960. His father was the director of the Kyoto Philharmonic, and he became a percussionist in the orchestra when he was 13. He studied music at Kyoto University, Juilliard School of Music, and Berklee College of Music, and has also lectured in music. His innovation and acrobatic drumming style earned him many accolades. In the 1960s he performed with Thor Johnson, Toru Takemitsu, and Hans Werner Henze amongst others. He changed his name from Tsutomu Yamashita to the phonetic Stomu Yamash'ta and in 1969 gained worldwide recognition during a concert with Seiji Ozawa and the Chicago Symphony Orchestra. Time reviewed the concert declaring 'the star of the evening was Stomu Yamash'ta who stole the show with his virtuoso performance', and when it was over the audience gave him a five-minute standing ovation.

At the turn of the 1970s he worked with Peter Maxwell Davies and brought the Red Buddha Theatre company from Japan to Europe, acting as their director, producer and composer, writing and performing in the multi-media event The Man From The East, with Morris Pert's Come To The Edge providing the musical backing.

He has composed for the British Royal Ballet; contributed pieces from his albums to the Nicolas Roeg film The Man Who Fell to Earth (starring David Bowie); performed in Peter Maxwell Davies's score for Ken Russell's The Devils and in John Williams' score for Robert Altman's Images (1972). He has also composed film scores. His Space Theme was used by the BBC on The Hitchhiker's Guide to the Galaxy.

Stomu Yamash'ta also appears in the last episode of Tony Palmer's All You Need is Love: The Story of Popular Music.

=== Name ===
Originally known as Tsutomu Yamashita, most of his albums for Western audiences use the name "Stomu Yamash'ta", though some (such as Go and Raindog) use the name "Yamashta" (without the apostrophe).

== Discography ==
- The World Of Stomu Yamash'ta (1971, live) (with Uzu, the first commercial digital recording ever made, and the second commercial digital recording ever released)
- Uzu: The World Of Stomu Yamash'ta 2 (1971, live) (recorded same time as above, but not released until eight months later)
- Percussion Recital (1971 - re-issue of the two albums above on one disc, less two tracks)
- Metempsychosis (1971, collaboration with Masahiko Sato)
- Red Buddha (1971)
- Sunrise From West Sea (1971, live)
- Floating Music (1972)
- Images original soundtrack (Robert Altman, 1972), music composed by John Williams; percussion solos by Stomu Yamashta
- Der langwierige Weg in die Wohnung der Natascha Ungeheuer (Hans Werner Henze) (1972)
- Henze/Takemitsu/Maxwell Davies (1972), comprising:
  - Prison Song (Henze)
  - Seasons (Takemitsu)
  - Turris Campanarum Sonatinum (Maxwell Davies)
- The Man From The East (1973, soundtrack)
- Freedom Is Frightening (1973)
- One by One (soundtrack) Stomu Yamash´ta´s East Wind (1974). (Information about the film is at One by One (1975 film))
- Raindog (1975)
- Die Neue Musik Und Ihre Neuesten Entwicklungen (1975), including:
  - El Cimarrón (Henze)
- Go (1976)
- Go Live From Paris (1976)
- Go Too (1977)
- Waza + Mujo 7" from:
  - Budo: The Art of Killing (1978, soundtrack)
- Iroha-Ten/Chi (1981)
- Iroha-Sui (1982)
- Tempest (1982, soundtrack)
- Iroha-Ka (1983)
- Kukai (1984, soundtrack)
- Sea & Sky (1985)
- Solar Dream, Vol. 2 Fantasy Of Sanukit (1990)
- Solar Dream, Vol. 1 The Eternal Present (1993)
- Solar Dream Vol. 3 Peace And Love (1997)
- A Desire of Beauty and Wonder Stone, Part 1 (1999)
- Listen To The Future, Vol. 1 (2001)
- Tofu (2002, compilation with Kodo, Yoshida Brothers, others)
- Live In Stockholm, Sweden, September 28, 1974 (2005, live)
- Bergmál (2006, collaboration with Ragnhildur Gísladóttir and Sjón)
- The Purple (2017)

== See also ==
- The Man Who Fell to Earth (a movie that uses a number of Yamash'ta tracks).
