= Das Wagner Desaster Live =

Das Wagner Desaster - Live -

Live album by Klaus Schulze
- Released: December 1, 1994
- Recorded: May 27 to 31, 1994 & August 1994
- Genres: Electronic music, space music, trance music
- Length: 135:15 (original); 154:32 (reissue)
- Label: ZYX
- Producer: Klaus Schulze

Klaus Schulze chronology
Totentag (1994)	Das Wagner Desaster - Live - (1994)	In Blue (1995)

Professional ratings
Review scores
Source	Rating
Allmusic	4/5 stars

Das Wagner Desaster Live is the thirtieth album by Klaus Schulze. It was originally released in 1994, and in 2005 was the fifteenth Schulze album reissued by Revisited Records. The reissue of Das Wagner Desaster Live is one of two examples of a Klaus Schulze reissue that changes the original order of the tracks (the other being Audentity). Das Wagner Desaster Live was released after Schulze's Silver Edition 10-disc CD box set, technically making this album his fortieth.

== Track listing ==
All tracks composed by Klaus Schulze.

Disc 1

No.	Title	Note	Length
1.	"Wagner (Wild Mix)"	on original release (disc 1, track 1)	28:32
2.	"Nietzsche (Wild Mix)"	on original release (disc 1, track 2)	28:40
3.	"Entfremdung (Wild Mix)"	on original release (disc 1, track 3)	10:00
4.	"Versöhnung (Soft Mix)"	on original release (disc 2, track 3)	11:44

Disc 2

No.	Title	Note	Length
1.	"Liebe (Soft Mix)"	on original release (disc 2, track 1)	28:00
2.	"Haß (Soft Mix)"	on original release (disc 2, track 2)	28:34
3.	"Encore Sevilla"	reissue bonus track	19:17

== Personnel ==
- Klaus Schulze – synthesizer, guitar, keyboards, voices, producer, computers, sampling, mixing, concept, Mini Moog
- Akai Adam – assistant engineer
- Werner Eggert – engineer, crew
- Dennis Lakey – sampling
