= Open the Door (Roger Hodgson album) =

2000 studio album by Roger Hogson

Studio album by Roger Hodgson
- Released: 9 May 2000
- Recorded: 1998–2000
- Studios: Studio Arpege (Les Sorinieres, France); Eglise Notre Dame de Bon-Port (Nantes, France); Unicorn Studios (Nevada City, California); Barrandov Studios (Prague, Czech Republic) (strings)
- Genre: Progressive rock
- Length: 52:43
- Labels: Roger Hodgson Music; Epic Records
- Producers: Alan Simon; Roger Hodgson

Roger Hodgson chronology
Rites of Passage (1997)	Open the Door (2000)	Classics Live (2010)

Singles from Open the Door
- 1. "Open The Door" / "Hungry" / "Danielle"; 2. "Hungry b/w Showdown"; 3. "Danielle (Limited Collector's Edition)"

Open the Door is the third studio album by English musician Roger Hodgson. It was his first since 1987's Hai Hai, and was released on 9 May 2000 on Epic Records. The Morse code at the beginning of the Along Came Mary song, spells out "Open the Door".

== Overview ==
Open the Door was recorded mostly in France and features mostly French musicians, many who have played on Excalibur (La Légende Des Celtes) also produced by Simon featuring contributions from Hodgson, as his backup band. This is Hodgson's only solo album to be partially recorded outside the United States.

Once again collaborating with Hodgson, former Yes guitarist and vocalist Trevor Rabin contributed electric guitar, keyboards and background vocals on "The More I Look". The song "Showdown" was performed live by Hodgson already in 1996 and a live version was released on his latest album Rites Of Passage. "Death and a Zoo", "Say Goodbye" and "The Garden" were performed live by Hodgson already in 1998.

Although uncredited, during a period of contact between Hodgson and his former long-time musical partner Rick Davies, the two of them collaborated on "Hungry", and simultaneously, Hodgson contributed to two of Davies' songs, "You Win I Lose" and "And The Light".

== Reception ==
Professional ratings
Review scores
Source	Rating
Allmusic	4.5/5 stars

Allmusic gave the album a positive review, calling it "the closest thing to Supertramp since ...Famous Last Words..." and praising the songwriting, particularly the unusual incorporation of French influences.

== Track listing ==
All tracks are written by Roger Hodgson, except where noted.

No.	Title	Writer(s)	Length
1.	"Along Came Mary"		6:24
2.	"The More I Look"		5:57
3.	"Showdown"		5:20
4.	"Hungry"		5:27
5.	"The Garden"		2:16
6.	"Death and a Zoo"		7:32
7.	"Love is a Thousand Times"		3:30
8.	"Say Goodbye"		3:57
9.	"Open the Door"		8:55
10.	"For Every Man"	Hodgson, Alan Simon	4:44

Bonus Track
No.	Title	Length
11.	"Danielle"	3:15

== Personnel ==
- Roger Hodgson – vocals, guitars (tracks 3, 4, 6, 10), 12-string guitar (tracks 1, 2, 7), bass guitar (track 8), keyboards (tracks 1–4, 6, 9), piano (track 6), harmonium (track 5), pipe organ (tracks 8, 9), harpsichord (track 8) church organ (track 11)
- Trevor Rabin – electric guitar, keyboards, backing vocals (track 2)
- Claude Samard – banjo, (track 3) Dobro slide guitar (tracks 3, 4), bouzouki (tracks 6, 7), pedal steel guitar (track 7), oud (track 9)
- Manuel Delgado – Spanish guitar (track 9), palmas (track 9)
- Dan Ar Braz – arpeggio guitar (track 10)
- Laurent Vernerey – bass guitar (tracks 1–5, 7, 9, 10)
- Alan Thomson – bass guitar (track 6)
- Arnaud Dunoyer – Hammond organ (tracks 1, 7, 9, 10)
- Olivier Rousseau – piano (tracks 2, 3)
- Alan Simon – high whistle (tracks 1, 6), bodhran (track 6), harmonica (track 9)
- Loïc Ponthieu – drums (tracks 1–5, 7, 9, 10)), wavedrum (track 9)
- Denis Banarrosh – percussion (tracks 1, 3–7, 9, 10)
- Gerry Conway – percussion (tracks 1, 6), drums (track 8)
- Jeff Phillips – drums (track 6)
- Jean Pierre Meneghin – Scottish drums (track 1)
- Gurvan Houdayer – Scottish drums (track 1)
- Christophe Negre – saxophone (1, 4, 10)
- Michel Gaucher – flute (track 9)
- Zdenek Rys – oboe (track 6)
- Bruno Le Rouzic – bagpipe (track 1)
- Pascal Martin – uilleann pipe (tracks 1, 6)
- Jean Louis Roques – accordion (tracks 1, 7, 10)
- Marco Canepa – Morse code (tracks 1, 10)
- Jean-Jacques Milteau – harmonica (track 3)
- Dominique Regef – rebec (track 5, 11), Hurdy Gurdy (track 6)
- Didier Lockwood – violin (tracks 3, 6, 8, 9)
- Pavel Belohlavek – cello (track 6)
- Ilana Russell (Alana Cunningham) – children's choir
- Sierrah Dietz – children's chorus (track 10)
- Justine Black – children's chorus (track 10)
- Molly Katwman – children's chorus (track 10)
- Nikki Matheson – backing vocals (track 11)
- The Prague Symphony Orchestra; conducted by Mario Klemens (tracks 1, 2, 5, 6, 8–10)
- The Bulgarian Voices "Philippopolis"; conducted by Hristo Arabadjiev (tracks 8, 9)
- Samples from: speech by Queen Elizabeth II (track 1), Rev. Jesse Jackson (track 3), Ronald Reagan (track 3), Sevik the wolf (track 6)

== Charts ==
Chart (2000)	Peak position
French Albums (SNEP)	30
German Albums (Offizielle Top 100)	74
Swiss Albums (Schweizer Hitparade)	33
