= Drive Inn (album) =

Studio album by Rainer Bloss and Klaus Schulze
- Released: 1984
- Recorded: September 1983
- Genre: Electronic
- Length: 39:56
- Label: Inteam

Rainer Bloss chronology
Aphrica (1984)	Drive Inn (1984)	Ampsy – A Mythodigital Fairytale of a Kinky Computer (1984)

Professional ratings
Review scores
Source	Rating
Allmusic	1.5/5 stars

Drive Inn is a collaboration album with Rainer Bloss and Klaus Schulze.

There exists an album called Drive Inn II, but despite the fact that Schulze's name is put on the cover, it is a Rainer Bloss solo project. Furthermore, there exists a Drive Inn III by Rainer Bloss. Klaus Schulze has nothing to do with it or any other of Rainer Bloss' solo recordings.

== Track listing ==
All tracks by Rainer Bloss & Klaus Schulze

1. "Drive Inn" – 03:42
2. "Sightseeing" – 06:24
3. "Truckin'" – 04:54
4. "Highway" – 04:45
5. "Racing" – 06:00
6. "Road Clear" – 11:11
7. "Drive Out" – 03:00

== Personnel ==
- Rainer Bloss – synthesizer, keyboards, producer
- Claus Cordes – design
- Ernst Fuchs – vocals
- Michael Garvens – percussion, vocals
- Klaus Schulze – synthesizer, guitar, keyboards, vocals, engineer, electronics
