= Go (Go album) =

Studio album by Go
- Released: 30 April 1976
- Recorded: 6–13 February 1976, Island studio London
- Studios: Island, Notting Hill, London
- Genres: Space rock; jazz fusion; progressive rock
- Length: 40:27
- Label: Island
- Producers: Dennis McKay & Stomu Yamashta with Paul Buckmaster

Go chronology
| Go (1976) | Go Live from Paris (1976) |

Professional ratings
Review scores
| Source | Rating |
|---|---|
| Allmusic | 4/5 stars |
| Allmusic | 4.5/5 stars |

Go is the debut studio album by the rock music supergroup Go. Recorded at Island Studios in London in February 1976, it was released on Island Records in April of the same year.

== Track listing ==
"Winner/Loser" by Steve Winwood, all other songs by Stomu Yamashta with lyrics by Michael Quartermain.

1. "Solitude" – 2:57
2. "Nature" – 2:32
3. "Air Over" – 2:32
4. "Crossing the Line" – 4:46
5. "Man of Leo" – 2:02
6. "Stellar" – 2:53
7. "Space Theme" – 3:12
8. "Space Requiem" – 3:20
9. "Space Song" – 2:00
10. "Carnival" – 2:46
11. "Ghost Machine" – 2:06
12. "Surfspin" – 2:25
13. "Time is Here" – 2:46
14. "Winner/Loser" – 4:10

A portion of "Crossing the Line" appears on the soundtrack of Tempest.

== Personnel ==
- Stomu Yamashta – string synthesizers (1, 3–9, 11), Minimoog synthesizer (3, 8, 9), timpani (3, 10), percussion (5, 6, 8–14), Mini Korg synthesizer (8, 9)
- Steve Winwood – acoustic piano (1, 2, 4, 10, 13, 14), vocal (2, 4, 5, 11, 13, 14), organ (5, 11), electric piano (6), guitar (14), string synthesizers (14)
- Michael Shrieve – drum kit (1–6, 10, 11, 13, 14)
- Klaus Schulze – synthesizers (Moog Modular, ARP 2600, ARP Odyssey, EMS Synthi A, Farfisa Syntorcheter) (1–5, 7–9, 11, 13)
- Chris West – rhythm guitar (1, 11, 13)
- Pat Thrall – lead and rhythm guitar (3, 4)
- Junior Marvin – rhythm guitar (4–6, 10, 14), guitar (14)
- Al Di Meola – lead guitar (5, 6, 10, 11, 13)
- Bernie Holland – guitar (10)
- Rosko Gee – bass guitar (1–7, 10–14)
- Hisako Yamashta – violin (9), voice (9)
- Paul Buckmaster – woodwind section arrangement (1, 2), brass section arrangement (5, 10), string section arrangement (10, 12, 13)
- Thunderthighs – backing vocals (4)
- Brother James – congas (11, 14)
- Lenox Langton – congas (11)
- Phill Brown – engineer
- Robert Ash – engineer

== Chart performance ==
| Chart (1976) | Peak position |
|---|---|
| US Billboard Top LPs & Tape | 60 |
