= Budo: The Art of Killing =

- Movie poster
- Directed by: Masayoshi Nemoto
- Written by: Masayoshi Nemoto
- Produced by: Hisao Masuda
- Narrated by: Harry J. Quini
- Cinematography: Ryo Yano; Yoshiaki Kato
- Edited by: Koichi Atsumi
- Music by: Stomu Yamashta
- Production company: The Arthur Davis Company
- Distributed by: Crown International Pictures; Prism Entertainment; Synapse Films
- Release dates: 1978 (Japan); 1982 (United States); 2005 (DVD)
- Running time: 90 min.
- Language: English

Budo: The Art of Killing is a 1978 Japanese martial arts documentary created and produced by Hisao Masuda and financed by The Arthur Davis Company. Considered a cult classic, the film is a compilation of various Japanese martial art demonstrations by several famous Japanese instructors such as Gozo Shioda, Taizaburo Nakamura and Teruo Hayashi. Martial arts featured in the film include: karate, aikido, kendo, sumo, and judo among others. The only modern Japanese martial art not featured in the film is kyūdō.

== Plot ==
Budo: The Art of Killing is a compilation of various gendai budō each demonstrated by famous Japanese martial artists from the late 1970s. The film treats its subject matter with deep respect and demonstrates a great reverence for both Budō and Japanese culture in general.

The film begins with Kunishirō Hayashi, reenacting seppuku, the ritualistic form of suicide practiced by Japanese samurai during Feudal Japan. This is followed by a demonstration of yabusame and footage of a samurai cavalry battle. The narrator then explains the connection between Budō and its universal symbol—the nihonto. After a demonstration of the effectiveness of the Japanese sword, the audience is shown the techniques developed by Okinawan farmers to combat the sword. Karate-do master Teruo Hayashi then demonstrates Okinawan weapon techniques. The film moves along with further footage of karate-do including makiwara training by Fujimoto (including the infamous shot of him striking a locomotive and chopping a beer bottle) and a demonstration of the nunchaku by Satoru Suzuki, a weapon made famous by Bruce Lee.

The film moves to footage of traditional Judo training such as mat rolls, pole-hopping, bunny-hops, and practice of hip throws using rubber bands tied around trees. The film moves on to discuss naginata-do, a budō popular with female martial art practitioners in Japan. Aikido is then demonstrated by Gozo Shioda, the founder of Yoshinkan aikido interspersed with shots of leaves falling into a brook. To emphasize the film's theme of "mind and body are one in Budo" the viewer is shown Shinto practitioners fire walking. The film then shows training in a sumo stable with rikishi Takamiyama, where the training shown is both tough and cruel. Scenes of young people practicing kobudo on the beach follow the sumo demonstration as the narrator discusses the succession of Budō to younger generations.

The film explains the importance of kata with Teruo Hayashi demonstrating more karate-do kumite. The narrator explains, "... karate training can be both severe and cruel, yet a sword can take away a life with one swing." The film shifts its focus to sword arts with demonstrations of iaido, tameshigiri and kendo by Shuji Matsushita and Tomoo Koide as the narrator discusses the fear instilled by the Japanese sword. The "limitless" connection between Zen Buddhism and Budō is discussed with Shuji Matsushita on the receiving end of a strike from an abbot's kyosaku while in zazen. This is followed by a highlight of the film in which Taizaburo Nakamura demonstrating various sword cuts including a shot filmed in slo-motion showing the shocking speed in which a Japanese sword can behead a man (1/100 of a second). Continuing with a focus on the sword, the film shows the art of traditional nihonto forging by swordsmith Amada Akitsugu, considered a national living treasure in Japan. Budo: The Art of Killing concludes with scenes of Noh as the narrator explains, "As long as the universal truths of heaven, the earth and man remain, the spirit of Budo shall endure."

== Featured martial artists ==
- Shuji Matsushita (Iaido)
- Taizaburo Nakamura (Iaido)
- Tasaburo Tokutomi (Iaido)
- Gozo Shioda (Aikido)
- Takamiyama (Sumo)
- Uragoro Takasago (Sumo)
- Teruo Hayashi (Okinawan kobudō)
- Toyoshima Kazutora (Kendo)
- Tomoo Koide (Kendo)
- Kazutora Toyoshima (Kendo)
- Toshishiro Obata (Kendo)
- Sadaharu Fujimoto (Karate-do)
- Shōgō Kuniba (Karate-do)
- Satoru Suzuki (Karate-do)
- Isao Okano (Judo)
- Fumiko Noda (Naginata-do)
- Iekata Kaneko (Yabusame)
- Amada Akitsugu (Swordsmith)

== History ==
Hisao Masuda had no luck trying to find financing for Budo: Art of Killing in his native Japan until he came across Arthur Davis, an American film exhibitor who ran a distribution company in Tokyo. Davis stated he funded the film out of the respect and gratitude he felt towards Japan. The Art of Killing won first prize at the 1978 Miami International Film Festival, but did not find an American distribution deal until 1981, when it was acquired by Crown International Pictures and received a limited release in 1982 under the title Budo. The film eventually got a VHS release through Prism Entertainment which helped build its cult status among Japanese martial arts practitioners and aficionados. The film was eventually remastered and released on DVD in 2005 by Synapse Films.

== Technical data ==
- Running time: 90 min.
- Country: Japan
- Language: English
- Color: Color
- Sound: Mono
- Aspect Ratio: 1.33:1
