= Go Too =

Studio album by Go
- Released: 1977
- Recorded: 1977, New York City
- Genre: Funk; jazz fusion
- Length: 42:30
- Label: Arista
- Producer: Stomu Yamashta

Go chronology
Go Live from Paris (1976)	Go Too (1977)

Professional ratings
Review scores
Source	Rating
Allmusic	4/5 stars

Go Too is the second and final studio album by Japanese rock supergroup Go, released in 1977. This is the band's only album to feature Jess Roden (having replaced English musician Steve Winwood on vocals). The style of the music became modified accordingly. In addition, Linda Lewis was hired as a singer. Together with The Headhunters bassist Paul Jackson, Jr. and the orchestra of Martyn Ford, the album unified various jazz, funk and classically influenced soundscapes.

The album begins with Prelude, a synthesizer tune marked by Klaus Schulze's distinctive style. This is followed by Seen You Before, a jazz-funk fusion piece with a remarkable guitar solo by Al Di Meola.

The next piece, Madness is a funk tune that crossfades at the end with the sound of waves into the romantic song Mystery of Love. The tune is dominated by Di Meola’s moving solos and the emotive vocals of Roden and Lewis.

Wheels of Fortune is characterized by complex polyrhythms and a pure jazz aesthetic. Beauty strikes another romantic tone. The album ends with another funky piece, You and Me, followed by Ecliptic, which is reminiscent of synthesizer produced whale song.

== Personnel ==
- Stomu Yamashta - keyboards, piano, tympani, percussions
- Klaus Schulze - synthesizers
- J. Peter Robinson - keyboards
- Al Di Meola - lead guitar
- Doni Harvey - guitar, vocals
- Jess Roden - lead vocals
- Linda Lewis - lead vocals
- Paul Jackson, Jr. - bass guitar
- Michael Shrieve - drums
- Brother James - conga drums & percussion
- The Martyn Ford Orchestra
- Paul Buckmaster - orchestrations

== Track listing ==
1. "Prélude" - 3:10
2. "Seen You Before" - 6:18
3. "Madness" - 6:27
4. "Mysteries of Love" - 6:15
5. "Wheels of Fortune" - 5:37
6. "Beauty" - 5:11
7. "You and Me" - 6:59
8. "Ecliptic" - 2:33

== Chart performance ==
Year	Chart	Position
1977	Billboard 200	156
