= Hai Hai =

Studio album by Roger Hodgson
- Released: 9 October 1987
- Recorded: Nevada City, California
- Genres: Dance-pop, pop rock, synthpop
- Length: 48:48
- Label: A&M
- Producers: Roger Hodgson, Jack Joseph Puig

Roger Hodgson chronology
In the Eye of the Storm (1984)	Hai Hai (1987)	Rites of Passage (1997)

Singles from Hai Hai
- 1. "London" Released: 1987; 2. "You Make Me Love You" Released: 1987; 3. "Land Ho" Released: 1988

Hai Hai is the second solo album by ex-Supertramp singer/guitarist/keyboardist Roger Hodgson, released in October 1987. Co-produced by future No Doubt and Black Crowes producer Jack Joseph Puig, and recorded at Hodgson's 48-track home studio in Nevada City, California, the album is a merger of Supertramp-styled progressive pop-rock and extensive use of Los Angeles session musicians and late-1980s synthesizer technology.

== Overview ==
Hai Hai features ten songs, all of which were written by Hodgson, with the exception of "Land Ho", an old Supertramp song (at the time never released on an album but only as a single), which Hodgson co-wrote in 1974 with his long-time partner Rick Davies. Hodgson had previously recorded the song in 1983 for his solo album In the Eye of the Storm, but it was never released.

== Background ==
Hodgson was unable to fully promote or tour behind Hai Hai, having sustained injuries to both of his wrists in a fall a week after its release. After that accident, Hodgson stopped his musical career for the next decade, returning to the public in 1997 with live shows and a live album, Rites of Passage. His next studio album, Open the Door, was released in 2000.

In the song "Hai Hai", backmasking is used 13 seconds in. When played in reverse, a whisper says "what happened to you?"

Hai Hai was re-released in Canada on November 14, 2006.

== Reception ==
Professional ratings
Review scores
Source	Rating
Allmusic	2/5 stars
New Musical Express	1/10

Allmusic panned the album in their retrospective review. They declared Hodgson's decision to abandon progressive rock and experiment with other genres a disaster, since he failed to fully commit to any of these genres, resulting in songs that are musically very basic and uninteresting. They also commented that the lyrics "are at times juvenile and embarrassing... he may have been trying to say something, but the poetry reads like a bored high school student wrote them." They added that the album's over-reliance on electronics and technology made the already uninspired songs sound cold and soulless.

== Track listing ==
All tracks are written by Roger Hodgson, except where noted.

No.	Title	Writer(s)	Length
1.	"Right Place"		4:06
2.	"My Magazine"		4:42
3.	"London"		4:13
4.	"You Make Me Love You"		5:09
5.	"Hai Hai"		5:31
6.	"Who's Afraid?"		5:01
7.	"Desert Love"		5:29
8.	"Land Ho"	Hodgson, Rick Davies	4:09
9.	"House on the Corner"		5:24
10.	"Puppet Dance"		5:17

== Personnel ==
- Roger Hodgson - vocals (all tracks); Synclavier drums (5), keyboards (3, 4, 5, 7–10), piano (6), synthesizer (6, 10), synth bass (1, 4), guitars (1, 2, 4, 5, 8, 10), 12-string guitar (7), bass (7), backing vocals (1, 3–5, 8–10)
- Dan Huff - guitars (1, 3, 5, 6–10)
- Ken Allardyce - harmonica (1, 5), rhythm guitar (3), backing vocals (3, 8)
- Nathan East - bass (3, 6, 9 & 10)
- Leland Sklar - bass (8)
- Robbie Buchanan - synths (1), synth programming (4, 6, 10), synth bass (5), Fender Rhodes piano (6), keyboards (3–5, 9)
- David Paich - synth bass (2), Hammond organ (2), synth brass (2)
- Steve Porcaro - synth programming (2)
- Larry Williams - saxophone (3), synth programming (7)
- Mikail Graham - DX7 seetar solo (3)
- Rhett Lawrence - Fairlight programming (5, 8, 10), synths (10)
- Eric Persing - synth programming (5, 6)
- Albhy Galuten - Synclavier drums (5)
- Bruce Albertine - Synclavier drums (5)
- Omar Hakim - drums (1)
- Joseph Pomfret - drums (1, 4, 6–8) [this is a pseudonym for Hodgson himself; Joseph is his second name and Pomfret his mother's surname]
- Jeff Porcaro - drums (2–4, 6, 9)
- Carlos Vega - drums (7, 8)
- Lenny Castro - percussion (1–6, 8–10)
- Marc Russo - saxophone (8)
- Anni McCann - backing vocals (1, 3–5, 8–10)
- Willie Hines - backing vocals (2)
- Brad Lang - backing vocals (2)
- Claire Diament - backing vocals (3)

== Charts ==
Chart (1987)	Peak position
Australian Albums (Australian Music Report)	88
Canada Top Albums/CDs (RPM)	42
Dutch Albums (Album Top 100)	52
Norwegian Albums (VG-lista)	20
Swiss Albums (Schweizer Hitparade)	16
US Billboard 200	163
