= Le Moulin de Daudet =

Soundtrack album by Klaus Schulze
- Released: 3 May 1994
- Recorded: March to September 1992
- Genre: Electronic music, space music
- Length: 63:51 (original); 79:09 (reissue)
- Label: Virgin
- Producer: Klaus Schulze

Klaus Schulze chronology
The Dome Event (1993)	Le Moulin de Daudet (1994)	Goes Classic (1994)

Le Moulin de Daudet is the twenty-seventh album by Klaus Schulze. It was originally released in 1994, and in 2005 was the fourth Schulze album reissued by Revisited Records. Le Moulin de Daudet was released after Schulze's Silver Edition 10-disc CD box set, technically making this album his thirty-seventh. It is the soundtrack to the film of the same name (on the life of Alphonse Daudet). The reissue bonus track is an excerpt from the previously released limited promo CD Ion (2004).

== Track listing ==
All tracks composed by Klaus Schulze.

No.	Title	Note	Length
1.	"The Beginning/The Delegates"	on original release	4:03
2.	"Mother Sadness"	on original release	3:01
3.	"The Loss of the Factory"	on original release	1:56
4.	"The Youth"	on original release	1:46
5.	"Friday's Departure"	on original release	0:48
6.	"The Mill of Maître Cornille"	on original release	1:46
7.	"Maître Cornille in the Fields"	on original release	1:08
8.	"Folk Dance"	on original release	1:27
9.	"The Discovery of Maître Cornille's Secret"	on original release	1:48
10.	"Joy of Maître Cornille/Garden & Youth (Reprise)"	on original release	3:14
11.	"Landscape/Way to the Old People"	on original release	2:36
12.	"Old People's Piano"	on original release	3:25
13.	"Old People's Farewell"	on original release	2:00
14.	"Exodus"	on original release	4:50
15.	"Le Petit Dauphin I"	on original release	5:29
16.	"Le Petit Dauphin II"	on original release	1:34
17.	"First Church Sequence"	on original release	1:59
18.	"Second Church Sequence & Organ"	on original release	6:55
19.	"St. Pierre"	on original release	2:15
20.	"Paradise & Inferno"	on original release	5:53
21.	"Finale"	on original release	4:57
22.	"The Ion Perspective"	reissue bonus track; complete version on Eternal (2017)	15:58
