= Audentity =

Studio album by Klaus Schulze
- Released: February 1983
- Recorded: 1982
- Genre: Electronic music, space music, trance music
- Length: 96:09 (original); 154:19 (reissue)
- Label: Innovative Communication
- Producer: Klaus Schulze

Klaus Schulze chronology
Trancefer (1981)	Audentity (1983)	Dziekuje Poland Live '83 (1983)

Professional ratings
Review scores
Source	Rating
Allmusic	3/5 stars

Audentity is the fifteenth album by Klaus Schulze. It was originally released in 1983, and in 2005 was the eleventh Schulze album reissued by Revisited Records. The reissue of Audentity is one of two instances of a Klaus Schulze reissue featuring a track order changed from that of the original release (the other being Das Wagner Desaster Live).

== Overview ==
As with Schulze's previous recording, Trancefer, Audentity is also heavily reliant on sequencers, but is less harsh in style. This is particularly evident in the tracks "Cellistica" and "Spielglocken". However, the heavy reliance on sequenced sound is not the case for all the tracks, and indeed "Sebastian im Traum" hints towards the operatic style of some of Schulze's much later works (like Totentag). "Sebastian im Traum", named after a poetry book by Georg Trakl, also contains a brief musical sequence that can be heard in the Michael Mann 1986 film Manhunter.

== Track listing ==
All tracks composed by Klaus Schulze.

Side one
No.	Title	Length
1.	"Cellistica"	24:31

Side two
No.	Title	Length
1.	"Tango-Saty"	5:47
2.	"Amourage"	10:37
3.	"Opheylissem"	5:11

Side three
No.	Title	Length
1.	"Spielglocken"	21:24

Side four
No.	Title	Length
1.	"Sebastian im Traum"	28:21

Deluxe edition bonus tracks (Gem)
No.	Title	Length
4.	"Gem"	11:41
5.	"Tiptoe on the Misty Mountain Tops"	14:43
6.	"Sink or Swim"	10:02
7.	"At the Angle of an Angel"	15:44
8.	"Of White Nights"	6:00

=== Notes ===
- On the vinyl release, the tracks on side two were grouped together as one track with a total length of 21:31.
- The contents of side two were placed on CD 2 of the deluxe edition due to space limitations.

== Personnel ==
- Klaus Schulze – Computer and keys, program
- Rainer Bloss – Sounds, Glockenspiel
- Michael Shrieve – EEH Computer, Simmons percussion
- Wolfgang Tiepold – Cello
