= The Dresden Performance =

Live album by Klaus Schulze
- Released: October 1990
- Recorded: 5 August 1989 & March to May 1990
- Genre: Electronic music, space music, new-age
- Length: 142:14
- Label: Virgin/Venture Records
- Producer: Klaus Schulze

Klaus Schulze chronology
Miditerranean Pads (1990)	The Dresden Performance (1990)	Beyond Recall (1991)

Professional ratings
Review scores
Source	Rating
Allmusic	4.5/5 stars

The Dresden Performance is the twenty-second album by Klaus Schulze. It was originally released in 1990. This is the first of seven early-1990s Klaus Schulze albums not reissued by Revisited Records. Although this album is labeled as "live", parts 3, 4 and 5 are studio tracks.

== Track listing ==
All the tracks are composed by Klaus Schulze.

2CD release
Disc 1

No.	Title	Note	Length
1.	"Dresden 1"	live	44:06
2.	"Dresden 3"	studio	10:28
3.	"Dresden 5"	studio	18:23

Disc 2

No.	Title	Note	Length
1.	"Dresden 2"	live	47:09
2.	"Dresden 4"	studio	22:01

This was also released as a double cassette, with parts 1, 2, 3, 5 and 4 (in that order), and an LP entitled Dresden - Imaginary Scenes was released, containing parts 3, 5 and 4 (in that order), both in Europe, also in 1990.
