= Red Buddha =

Studio album by Stomu Yamashta
- Released: 1971
- Recorded: 1970
- Genre: World, Avant-garde, Jazz
- Length: 31:24
- Label: King Records Japan

Stomu Yamashta chronology
Metempsychosis (1971)	Red Buddha (1971)	Sunrise From West Sea (1971)

Red Buddha is a 1971 album composed and performed by Japanese percussionist Stomu Yamashta, recorded in 1970 and re-released on CD (Spalax) in 2006.

Professional ratings
Review scores
Source	Rating
Allmusic	4/5 stars

== Track listing ==
All songs composed and arranged by Stomu Yamashta

1. "Red Buddha" - 15:19
2. "As Expanding As" - 15:55

== Personnel ==
- Stomu Yamashta - metal strings, cymbal, musical saw, mandolin harp, steel drum, marimba, cow bell, wood block, and skin drum
