= Novo Combo =

Novo Combo was a power pop and new wave rock group, active in the early 1980s. Their initial lineup was Pete Hewlett, Stephen Dees, Jack Griffith, and drummer Michael Shrieve (formerly with Santana). The band had minor hits in 1981 with the songs "Up Periscope" and "City Bound."

== History ==
Lead singer and bassist Stephen Dees released a solo album for RCA Records called From the Hip in 1977 which was produced by Daryl Hall. He performed with many other acts from the 1980s including Hall and Oates as well as Tony Carey. He was also featured in the Tony Carey video of "The First Day of Summer". Dees would later form his own independent pop/art rock band Bandees in the late 1990s.

Lead guitarist Jack Griffith performed with Mick Jagger, Carlos Santana, and Gary Moore, in addition to penning songs for Warner Chappell, Fiona, and Revo Bop. Now he has his own Commercial Business Studio, where he records bands, and produces TV commercials.

Novo Combo's singer and guitarist Pete Hewlett lives in Pittsburgh. He toured and recorded with Billy Joel, Carly Simon, Joe Jackson, Julian Lennon, Amy Grant, and Eric Carmen. Pete Hewlett got his first recording contract when he was 16 years old. His band Peter's Pipers won a battle of the bands' contest at West View Park that sent them onto the national finals and got them a deal with Philips Mercury Records.

Then came a new band—Sweet Lightning—and the attention of RCA Records, where they recorded an LP and a pair of singles. Afterward, the band moved to Cleveland, where Pete recorded with Eric Carmen (Raspberries), then joined the Euclid Beach Band, for which Carmen made an appearance on their one-off self-titled album from 1979.

A turning point came two years later when Hewlett's former Sweet Lightning bandmate Syd McGinness (guitarist for David Letterman) recommended Hewlett to Carly Simon, who was looking for a new backup singer. Hewlett got the job, moved to New York City, recorded "Come Upstairs" and headed out on tour with Simon.

While in New York, Hewlett answered an audition with Stephen, Jack, and Michael and formed Novo Combo. They were signed to Polygram and put out two albums: Novo Combo in 1981 and The Animation Generation in 1982. In their review of The Animation Generation, GloryDazeMusic.com opined that "the songs which stand out are the ones in which Pete Hewlett sings." Novo Combo toured with The Who, Cheap Trick, and Greg Lake and performed at the Montreux Jazz Festival '81.

Hewlett then worked with Billy Joel. Hewlett hit the road with Joel for the An Innocent Man and The Bridge world tours. Then came the tour that made international news: Billy Joel would bring a fully staged rock production to the Soviet Union as part of the Ronald Reagan-Mikhail Gorbachev 1985 Geneva summit. Hewlett performed with Joel in Moscow and Leningrad—and made history as part of the first live rock radio broadcast in Soviet history, which was also simulcast in the United States. The live double album, Kohuept (translation: 'In Concert'), chronicled the trip.

Back in the States, Hewlett recorded the Starlight Express Broadway soundtrack, Joe Jackson's Big World recording and U.S. Concert Tour, Julian Lennon's The Secret Value of Daydreaming album and Amy Grant's 1997 World Leader Summit performance. Most recently, Hewlett joined Billy Joel once again to perform at the "Last Play at Shea" concerts in July 2008. NOVO COMBO is presently working on a new Production Album, CD to be released Mid 2020.

== Discography ==
=== Studio albums ===
Title	Album details	Chart
Title	Album details	US
Novo Combo	Released: 1981; Label: Polydor	167
The Animation Generation	Released: 1982; Label: Polydor	—
"-" denotes a recording that did not chart or was not released in that territory.

=== Singles ===
Year	Single	Positions	Album
Year	Single	US Main. Rock	Album
1981	"Up Periscope"	43	Novo Combo
1982	"Tattoo"	42	Novo Combo
1982	"Too Long Gone"	—	The Animation Generation
"—" denotes a recording that did not chart or was not released in that territory.
