= Douglas September =

Canadian musician

- Born: September 25, 1972 (age 54)
- Origin: Cape Breton, Nova Scotia
- Genres: Folk, blues, rock
- Instrument: Guitar
- Years active: 1990s–present
- Website: www.douglasseptember.com

Douglas September (born September 25, 1972, in Cape Breton, Nova Scotia) is a Canadian musician. He is known for his poetic lyrics, as well as his innovative musical style that blends folk and blues with a caustic modern commentary. As a composer, musician, producer and engineer, September's passion for arranging music from the ordinary every day into a unique auditory experience has evolved into a singular style. His music has been likened to Bob Dylan, Tim Buckley, and Tom Waits.

== Career ==
September has collaborated with many talented musicians, such as Michael Shrieve (1998 release, Producer-Ten Bulls; Gold Circle/Samson Music), Bill Frisell (1998 release, Lead Guitar-Ten Bulls; Gold Circle/Samson Music), David Torn (2001 release, Producer-Oil Tan Bow; Lupins), Robby Aceto (2001 release, Oil Tan Bow; Lupins and 1999 release, IO; Gold Circle/Samson Music), Rich DePaolo; (1999 release, IO;Gold Circle/Samson Music), Wayne Horvitz (1998 release, Ten Bulls; Gold Circle/Samson Music), David Bearwald and Steve Lindsey (The Runner, 2000).

He has four albums as a solo performer with two where he is involved in co-production, and composing music for The Runner and was signed previously with what is now known as Gold Circle Films for albums Ten Bulls and Io. He has also been producer/engineer for other artists such as Halifax songwriter Matthew Grimson, guitarist Tom Fidgen, B3 Hammond organist John T. Davis, and scored a soundtrack for the short film Malcontents.

In January 2005, UK Uncut, listed Douglas September's song "Lady and I" from album 10 Bulls as their #1 Track influenced by Bob Dylan.

Originally from Cape Breton Island, off the east coast of Canada, Douglas currently lives in Toronto, Ontario, Canada, with his wife and daughter.

== Discography ==
- (1996) Crows; Lupins
  Produced by Vaughn Passmore
  Recorded at Invisible Sound, Toronto, ON
- (1998) Ten Bulls; Gold Circle/Samson Music
  Produced by Michael Shrieve
  Musicians: Douglas September, Bill Frisell (Guitar), Wayne Horvitz (Keyboards), Michael Rhodes (Bass), Michael Shrieve (Drums & Percussion), Loops & Textures (David Torn)
- (1999) IO; Gold Circle/Samson Music;
  Produced by Douglas September, Robby Aceto, Rich DePaolo, Bill King, et al.
  Musicians: Douglas September, Robby Aceto (Guitars, Ambient loops, Harmonium, Vibes, Alto Mandolin, Accordion), Bill King (Drums), Rich DePaolo (Bass), et al.
- (2001) Oil Tan Bow; Lupins;
  Produced By: SPLaTTeRCell (David Torn) and Robby Aceto with additional production by Douglas September.
  Musicians: Douglas September, Robby Aceto (Guitars, Loops, Accordion), SPLaTTeRCell (David Torn) (Additional Freq Programming & Rhythm Arrangements).
- (2009) Sundays in Radio

== Soundtracks and short film ==
- (1999) The Runner, directed by Ron Moler, compositions for scene and closing credits (The Search, The Light)
- (2004) Malcontents, directed by Maurey Loeffler, scoring and composition for short film.
- (2006–2008) Douglas September Videos on YouTube
- (2008) Sundays in Television, Podcast
