= Royal Festival Hall Vol. 2 =

Live album by Klaus Schulze
- Released: 9 November 1992
- Recorded: 10 September 1991 & 1992
- Genres: Electronic music, space music
- Length: 67:54
- Label: Virgin
- Producer: Klaus Schulze

Klaus Schulze chronology
Royal Festival Hall Vol. 1 (1992)	Royal Festival Hall Vol. 2 (1992)	The Dome Event (1993)

Professional ratings
Review scores
Source	Rating
Allmusic	3/5 stars

Royal Festival Hall Vol. 2 is the twenty-fifth album by Klaus Schulze. It was originally released in 1992. This is the fourth of seven early-1990s Klaus Schulze albums not to be reissued by Revisited Records.

== Track listing ==
All tracks composed by Klaus Schulze.

No.	Title	Length
1.	"Ancient Ambiance"	44:45
2.	"Anchorage"	11:03
3.	"Variation on B.F."	11:45
