= In the Eye of the Storm (Roger Hodgson album) =

Studio album by Roger Hodgson
- Released: 1 October 1984
- Recorded: 1983–84, Nevada City, California
- Genres: Pop rock, progressive pop, soft rock
- Length: 47:11
- Label: A&M
- Producer: Roger Hodgson

Roger Hodgson chronology
In the Eye of the Storm (1984)	Hai Hai (1987)

Singles from In the Eye of the Storm
- 1. "Had a Dream (Sleeping With the Enemy)" Released: October 1984; 2. "In Jeopardy" Released: 1984

In the Eye of the Storm is the first solo album by former Supertramp member Roger Hodgson. Some of its songs (e.g. "Hooked on a Problem" and "Only Because of You") were initially written and recorded for Supertramp's previous album ...Famous Last Words..., but not released.

== Overview ==
The album's first single was the four-minute edit of "Had a Dream (Sleeping with the Enemy)", which peaked at number 48 on the Billboard Hot 100. The follow-up single, a four-minute edit of "In Jeopardy", was a minor hit, peaking at number 30 on the Mainstream Rock Tracks chart but failing to crack the Billboard Hot 100. The album itself was only moderately successful, stalling at number 46 on the Billboard album chart and only reaching number 70 on the UK Albums Chart. It performed far better in Canada, going platinum within a month of its release. It also enjoyed success in Australia, hitting number 23 on the album charts as "Had a Dream (Sleeping with the Enemy)" peaked at number 21. "Lovers in the Wind" became a hit in Argentina and the Philippines.

A sticker affixed to the cover cellophane of the album name-dropped both the album's two singles and "Hooked on a Problem", indicating that "Hooked" may have been intended for a single release at some point.

== Reception ==
Professional ratings
Review scores
Source	Rating
AllMusic	4.5/5 stars

The album received a positive review from AllMusic, who stated that the album's key quality is that Hodgson plays the vast majority of the instruments himself. They also noted "The spirit of traditional progressive rock experimentation is alive on this album; five of the seven songs exceed six minutes."

== Track listing ==
All songs written and arranged by Roger Hodgson.

1. "Had a Dream (Sleeping with the Enemy)" (8:27)
2. "In Jeopardy" (5:59)
3. "Lovers in the Wind" (4:11)
4. "Hooked on a Problem" (5:10)
5. "Give Me Love, Give Me Life" (7:33)
6. "I'm Not Afraid" (7:03)
7. "Only Because of You" (8:40)

== Personnel ==
- Roger Hodgson - lead and backing vocals, piano and synthesizers (all tracks); electric guitar (tracks 1, 2, 4, 5, 6, 7), 12-string guitar (tracks 1, 3); Hammond organ (tracks 1, 2, 5, 6), electric piano (track 4), bass guitar (tracks 1, 2, 4, 5, 6), drums (tracks 3, 4)
- Michael Shrieve - drums (tracks 1, 2, 5–7)
- Ken Allardyce - harmonica (track 6), additional vocals (tracks 2, 3, 5)
- Jimmy Johnson - fretless bass (tracks 3, 7)
- Claire Diament - vocals (track 7)
- Scott Page - saxophone (track 4)

== Production ==
- Written, arranged and produced by Roger Hodgson
- Recorded at Unicorn Studios, Nevada City, California.
- Recording engineers: Scott Litt & James Farber
- Assistant recording engineer: Ken Allardyce
- Technical assistance: Chris Amson
- Mixed at Power Station, New York
- Mixing engineer: James Farber
- Assistant mixing engineers: Ken Allardyce & Malcolm Pollack
- Mastered at Masterdisk, New York
- Mastering: Howie Weinberg
- Digitally remastered by Andrew Garver at A&M Mastering Studios, Hollywood, CA.
- Special thanks to Yamaha and Skip's Music, Sacramento
- Roger Hodgson represented by Doug Pringle

The following inscription is printed inside the CD booklet:

I'd like to thank all those who weathered the storm with me, especially Doug Pringle and Ken Allardyce, for their musical and moral support.

== Charts ==
Chart (1984–85)	Peak position
Australian Albums (Australian Music Report)	23
Canada Top Albums/CDs (RPM)	15
Dutch Albums (Album Top 100)	19
German Albums (Offizielle Top 100)	20
Norwegian Albums (VG-lista)	14
Swedish Albums (Sverigetopplistan)	41
Swiss Albums (Schweizer Hitparade)	6
UK Albums (Official Charts)	70
US Billboard 200	46

== Certifications ==
Region	Certification	Certified units/sales
Canada (Music Canada)	Platinum	100,000^{^}
^{^} Shipments figures based on certification alone.
