= Go Live from Paris =

Live album by Go
- Released: 1976
- Recorded: 12 June 1976
- Venue: Palais des Sports, Paris, France
- Genre: Rock; jazz fusion
- Length: 63:49
- Label: Island
- Producer: Stomu Yamashta

Go chronology
Go (1976)	Go Live from Paris (1976)	Go Too (1977)

Professional ratings
Review scores
Source	Rating
Allmusic	3.5/5 stars
Allmusic	4.5/5 stars

Go Live from Paris is the second album by Go, recorded live in Paris at the Palais des Sports on 12 June 1976.

== Track listing ==
All songs composed by Stomu Yamash'ta with lyrics by Michael Quartermain, except "Winner/Loser" – lyrics by Steve Winwood.

1. "Space Song" – 2:30
2. "Carnival" – 1:12
3. "Wind Spin" – 9:30
4. "Ghost Machine" – 3:45
5. "Surf Spin" – 2:20
6. "Time is Here" – 9:20
7. "Winner/Loser" – 5:10
8. "Solitude" – 2:00
9. "Nature" – 4:25
10. "Air Voice" – 1:19
11. "Crossing The Line" – 7:50
12. "Man of Leo" – 15:30
13. "Stellar" – 1:25
14. "Space Requiem" – 3:25

== Personnel ==
- Stomu Yamashta – percussion and keyboards
- Steve Winwood – vocals and piano
- Michael Shrieve – drums
- Klaus Schulze – synthesizers
- Al Di Meola – lead guitar
- Jerome Rimson – bass
- Pat Thrall – guitar (solo on "Crossing The Line")
- Brother James – congas
- Karen Friedmann – vocals
