= Dziekuje Poland Live '83 =

Dziękuję Poland Live '83

Live album by Klaus Schulze
- Released: 1983
- Recorded: 1983
- Genre: Electronic music, space music, trance music
- Length: 94:30 (original); 154:27 (reissue)
- Label: IC
- Producer: Klaus Schulze

Klaus Schulze chronology
Audentity (1983)	Dziękuję Poland Live '83 (1983)	Angst (1984)

Professional ratings
Review scores
Source	Rating
Allmusic	link

Dziękuję Poland Live '83 is the sixteenth album by Klaus Schulze. It was originally released in 1983, and in 2006 was the seventeenth Schulze album reissued by Revisited Records. "Katowice" is essentially a live version of "Spielglocken" from Audentity. "Lodz" is essentially a live version of "Ludwig II von Bayern" from X. "Dzien dobry!" is an alternate take of "Katowice"/"Spielglocken".

== Track listing ==
All tracks composed by Klaus Schulze.

Disc 1

No.	Title	Note	Length
1.	"Katowice"	on original release	26:22
2.	"Warsaw"	on original release	24:16
3.	"The Midas Hip Hop Touch"	reissue bonus track	25:15

Disc 2

No.	Title	Note	Length
1.	"Lodz"	on original release	20:59
2.	"Gdansk"	on original release	15:45
3.	"Dziekuje"	on original release	5:52
4.	"Dzien Dobry!"	reissue bonus track	35:58

== Personnel ==
- Klaus Schulze – synthesizer, guitar, keyboards, vocals, Moog synthesizer, Fairlight
- Rainer Bloss – synthesizer, keyboards, computers
