= Royal Festival Hall Vol. 1 =

Live album by Klaus Schulze
- Released: 9 November 1992
- Recorded: 10 September 1991 & 1992
- Genres: Electronic music, space music
- Length: 69:36
- Label: Virgin
- Producer: Klaus Schulze

Klaus Schulze chronology
Beyond Recall (1991)	Royal Festival Hall Vol. 1 (1992)	Royal Festival Hall Vol. 2 (1992)

Professional ratings
Review scores
Source	Rating
Allmusic	3/5 stars

Royal Festival Hall Vol. 1 is the twenty-fourth album by Klaus Schulze. It was originally released in 1992. This is the third of seven early-1990s Klaus Schulze albums not to be reissued by Revisited Records.

== Track listing ==
All tracks composed by Klaus Schulze.

No.	Title	Length
1.	"Yen"	44:32
2.	"Silence and Sequence"	24:57
