= Aphrica =

Studio album by Klaus Schulze, Rainer Bloss & Ernst Fuchs
- Released: March 1984, withdrawn 1984
- Recorded: September 1983, Hambühren
- Genre: Avant-garde
- Length: 38:50
- Label: Inteam

Aphrica is a collaboration album by Klaus Schulze, Rainer Bloss and Ernst Fuchs, with the painter Fuchs providing vocals. Aphrica was both released and withdrawn in 1984. Although the reason the album was taken off the market was mainly legal (the label Inteam had "forgotten" to make a contract with Fuchs), Schulze had very little positive to say about the collaboration in retrospect: "Besides, it's an awful album, just because of that silly singing or recitation. Fuchs tries to be "serious", but he's only involuntarily funny. In Germany we have the word "peinlich" for it." The press seemed to agree. According to tip, a Berlin-based magazine, "(...) due to their grandiloquent dimwittedness, the lyrics provoke only tormented laughter." (June 1984)

== Track listing ==
1. "Aphrodite" – 19:40
2. "Brothers and Sisters" – 12:20
3. "Africa" – 06:50
