= The Big Picture (Michael Shrieve album) =

Studio album by Michael Shrieve & David Beal
- Released: 1988
- Recorded: Different Fur Recording, San Francisco, CA; Millbrook Sound Studios, Millbrook, NY; Platinum Island Studios, NY, NY; Studio D, Sausalito, CA.
- Genre: New-age
- Length: 44:21
- Label: Fortuna
- Producer: David Beal, Michael Shrieve

Michael Shrieve chronology
Transfer Station Blue (1984)	The Big Picture (1988)	Stiletto (1989)

Professional ratings
Review scores
Source	Rating
Allmusic	4.5/5 stars

The Big Picture is a collaborative album by Michael Shrieve and David Beal, released in 1988 through Fortuna Records.

== Track listing ==
All music is composed by Michael Shrieve & David Beal

Side one
No.	Title	Length
1.	"The Invisible Architect"	5:45
2.	"Mon amie"	4:08
3.	"Unspeakable Dawn"	7:09
4.	"Izibongo"	5:22

Side two
No.	Title	Length
1.	"Shaman's Drum"	5:30
2.	"The Big Picture"	6:05
3.	"Rocked in the Cradle of the Deep"	5:24
4.	"Iron Voices"	4:57

== Personnel ==
- Andrew Aturmer – acoustic guitar
- David Beal – musician, production
- Catanzaro – photography
- Mahdessian – photography
- Jeffrey Norman – engineering
- Paul Orofino – engineering
- John Rollo – engineering
- Mark Senasac – engineering
- Michael Shrieve – musician, production
