= In Jeopardy =

Single by Roger Hodgson

from the album In the Eye of the Storm
- B-side: "I'm Not Afraid"
- Released: 1984
- Recorded: 1983–84
- Studio: Unicorn Studios, Nevada City, California
- Genre: Pop rock, progressive pop, soft rock
- Length: 5:59
- Label: A&M
- Songwriter(s): Roger Hodgson
- Producer(s): Roger Hodgson

Roger Hodgson singles chronology
"Had a Dream (Sleeping With the Enemy)" (1984)	"In Jeopardy" (1984)	"Lovers in the Wind" (1984)

"In Jeopardy" is a song by Roger Hodgson, released in 1984 as the second single from his debut solo album In the Eye of the Storm. It peaked at number 30 on the Billboard Mainstream Rock chart.

== Charts ==
Chart (1984)	Peak position
US Mainstream Rock (Billboard)	30
