= Big Picture (magazine) =

British educational magazine

- Categories: Interdisciplinary
- Publisher: Wellcome Trust
- First issue: 2005
- Country: United Kingdom
- Language: English
- Website: bigpictureeducation.com
- ISSN: 1745-7777

The Big Picture series provides teachers and post-16 students with up-to-date information on research findings in biology and medicine, and the social and ethical implications of this research. Published by the Wellcome Trust as a free educational resource, each issue is available for free electronically. The website provides free resources for teachers and online activities for students, including lesson ideas, animations, image galleries and short videos. As of 2016, the print subscription has been discontinued and replaced with online only.

== Recent issues and topics ==
=== 22: Space Biology (June 2015) ===
Big Picture’s first 21 issues have been firmly grounded on planet Earth. Now we’d like to look at an even bigger picture – the universe. Space biology looks at life in space from several perspectives: how it began, where it might be, and the effects of as a rather extreme habitat.

=== 21: Immune System (January 2015) ===
The immune system is what keeps us healthy in spite of the many organisms and substances that can do us harm. In this issue, explore how our bodies are designed to prevent potentially harmful objects from getting inside, and what happens when bacteria, viruses, fungi or other foreign organisms or substances breach these barriers.

=== 20: Populations (June 2014) ===
What’s the first thing that pops into your mind when you read the word population? Most likely it’s the ever-increasing human population on earth. You’re a member of that population, which is the term for all the members of a single species living together in the same location. The term population isn’t just used to describe humans; it includes other animals, plants and microbes too. In this issue, we learn more about how populations grow, change and move, and why understanding them is so important.

=== 19: Proteins (January 2014) ===
Proteins are polymers of amino acids, and they do all sorts of incredible things. They give structure to living things, carry messages and molecules around our bodies, support the immune system and catalyse chemical reactions, and they are used widely in industry and medicine too. In this issue, we explore proteins and discover how they are involved in all kinds of processes in humans and other organisms.

=== 18: Number Crunching (June 2013) ===
In this issue, we explore how science works and look at how statistics can help us summarise data, see whether our figures are significant and put our findings into context. We explore probability, significance and risk, and look at how statistics and numbers can be misreported and misrepresented.

=== 17: Inside the Brain (January 2013) ===
Developments in technology and medicine mean that doctors and scientists can examine our brains in more ways and more detail than ever before, all without having to open up the body. In this issue, we explore how imaging research has changed the way we can look inside the human brain.

=== 16: Careers from biology (June 2012) ===
Decisions about careers can be tricky, especially for students. So, in this issue, we explore where studying biology can lead. Alongside our usual infographic and fast facts, meet 10 people who use biology in their jobs in very different ways.

=== 15: Exercise, Energy and Movement (January 2012) ===
Movement is a fundamental characteristic of living creatures. In this issue we look at the biological systems that keep us moving and consider some of the psychological, social and ethical aspects of exercise and sport.

=== 14: Food and Diet (June 2011) ===
Like all living things, humans need energy. In this issue we look at the latest biological and medical research findings to investigate different aspects of diet and nutrition – including appetite, obesity, taste, allergies, metabolic diseases, epigenetics, food policy and behaviour.

=== 13: The Cell (January 2011) ===
We all share something amazing in common - that we developed from a single sperm and egg to become complicated, sophisticated organisms made of trillions of cells. But how can cells grow and develop to form such complex creatures? Explore the secrets of animal cells, including development, differentiation and death, in this issue, which is accompanied by a full-colour poster.

=== 12: Addiction (June 2010) ===
Addiction is a term we all use, but what does it mean? In this issue, explore some of the different ways in which people understand addiction, and how even professionals working in the field can't agree on a single definition. Find out about how being addicted affects your mind, body and everyday life, and join us in imagining how the future of addiction might unfold.

=== 11: Genes, Genomes and Health (January 2010) ===
In recent years, mind-boggling progress has been made in genome sequencing and understanding the huge amount of data such an activity produces. Our genes play a key part in making us who we are, but how can science help us understand our genetic identity? In this issue, find out how the genetic information we carry in nearly all of our cells can not only give us an insight into our past, but is also beginning to reveal clues about our lives and health in the future.

=== 10: Music, Mind and Medicine (June 2009) ===
Most of us hear some form of music each day. It is a popular leisure activity and accompanies many of the most significant points of our lives. Even so, music remains one of life's great mysteries. How can it have such a powerful impact? And what exactly is music? Big Picture explores these issues with online activities, audio and video.

=== 9: Health and climate change (January 2009) ===
The Earth's climate is changing ever faster, and human activities play a role in speeding up this change. But there are consequences. Learn more about how climate change affects our health.

=== 8: How we look (June 2008) ===
When we see people, we recognise individuals, we make judgements about them, we draw conclusions about their age, their sex, their personality, their mood and their intentions. And, deliberately or not, we send signals to others - through our expressions, the way we dress and the way we modify our bodies. This issue of 'Big Picture' looks at this remarkable interplay - between the biology that sculpts our form and the culture that interprets, embellishes and adapts this form. It asks what we mean by ‘normal’, what beauty is and how such concepts influence the way we live. It looks at why we take the form we do and considers what we might look like in the future.

=== 7: Drug Development (January 2008) ===
While providing immense benefits, drugs are not the perfect solution. They only work on a proportion of patients, sometimes they harm us, and we're not very good at taking them as we should. For some diseases, particularly those affecting only developing countries, there are no drugs available or they are too expensive. Drugs seem to be the answer to everything from rheumatism, through birth control, to depression. And yet while agonising over pill-popping, we consume vast amounts of untested complementary remedies. How has this situation come about? What part do pharmaceuticals play in modern life? And where might we go in the future? These are some of the questions tackled in the 'Big Picture on Drug Development'.

=== 6: Epidemics (September 2007) ===
One of the reasons that infections are so frightening is the speed with which they can kill. Doctors dealing with human cases of avian flu in the Far East have seen their patients worsen dramatically and die within a day. Add to that the fear of the new and unknown, and emerging infections can seem truly terrifying. How do we stop new diseases emerging or re-emerging infections getting out of hand? How does this happen in a world of such global economic imbalance, where countries vary greatly in the resources they can put into fighting disease? And how do we balance individual rights with the need to protect public health?

=== 5: Evolution (January 2007) ===
"Nothing in biology makes sense except in the light of evolution." When biologist Theodosius Dobzhansky wrote these words in 1973, he was reflecting on the coming together of two strands of thinking: evolutionary change, kick-started by Darwin in the mid-19th century, and genetics, a subject whose origins go back to the same year, with Mendel's studies, but only really got going in the 20th century. Since then, the general principles of Darwinian evolution have been widely accepted. At least, they have been in the scientific community. In wider society, a significant proportion of people remain sceptical. Why should this be? Why does Darwinian evolution raise controversy when, say, quantum mechanics scarcely registers on the public consciousness? This issue of 'Big Picture' looks at the theory of evolution, the evidence that supports it, unanswered questions and the history of public reaction.

=== 4: Thinking (September 2006) ===
New techniques have opened up ways of exploring the brain. Functional imaging allows us to watch the brain in action; our understanding of the biochemistry of nerve function has blossomed; and the genetic revolution has allowed us to probe the function of individual genes and proteins. These techniques are shedding light on the very essence of human life - how we feel, think and act. Even the nature of consciousness is beginning to be unravelled.
