= Megaton =

Megaton may refer to:

- A million tons
- Megaton TNT equivalent, explosive energy equal to 4.184 petajoules
- megatonne, a million tonnes

== Other uses ==
- Olivier Megaton (born 1965), French film director, writer and editor
- Megaton Dias (born 1967), a Brazilian jiu-jitsu practitioner and instructor
- Megaton (Fallout 3), a fictional town built around a nuclear bomb in the video game Fallout 3
- "Megaton Punch", a mini-game in the games Kirby Super Star and Kirby Super Star Ultra
- Megaton, a superhero anthology self-published by Gary Carlson from 1981 to 1987

== See also ==
- Kiloton
- Gigaton
- Teraton
- Petaton
- Exaton
