= Klaus Schulze Goes Classic =

Goes Classic

Studio album by Klaus Schulze
- Released: 26 June 1994
- Recorded: 1991 – March 1993
- Genre: Electronic music, space music, classical
- Length: 78:27
- Label: ZYX
- Producer: Klaus Schulze

Klaus Schulze chronology
Le Moulin de Daudet (1994)	Goes Classic (1994)	Totentag (1994)

Goes Classic is the twenty-eighth album by Klaus Schulze. It was originally released in 1994. This is the sixth of seven early-1990s Klaus Schulze albums not to be reissued by Revisited Records. Goes Classic was released after Schulze's Silver Edition 10-disc CD box set, technically making this album his thirty-eighth. The album consists of electronic renditions of six well-known classical pieces, plus one original Schulze composition.

In 2012 the Russian label Mirumir released a double vinyl edition titled Midi Klassik.

== Track listing ==
No.	Title	Length
1.	"Friedrich Smetana: Die Moldau"	12:00
2.	"Franz Schubert: Rosamunde"	7:53
3.	"Carl Maria von Weber: Der Freischütz (Ouvertüre)"	10:22
4.	"Klaus Schulze: Quintet for Lute"	10:53
5.	"Johannes Brahms: Hungarian Dance No. 2"	9:01
6.	"Edvard Grieg: Dances From Norway No. 1,2,3"	10:33
7.	"Ludwig van Beethoven: Violin Concerto Op. 61, 1 Movement"	17:18
