= Megatone (Richard Wahnfried album) =

Studio album by Klaus Schulze
- Released: September 1984
- Recorded: 1984, Hambühren
- Genres: Electronic music, rock
- Length: 43:22
- Label: Inteam
- Producer: Klaus Schulze

Klaus Schulze chronology
| Tonwelle (1981) | Megatone (1984) | Miditation (1986) |

Professional ratings
Review scores
| Source | Rating |
|---|---|
| Allmusic | 2/5 stars |

Megatone is the third studio album by Klaus Schulze's side project, Richard Wahnfried, released in 1984. On this album, Schulze collaborates with Michael Garvens, Axel-Glenn Müller, Ulli Schober, Michael Shrieve and Harald Katzsch.

== Track listing ==
| No. | Title | Length |
|---|---|---|
| 1. | "Angry Young Boys" | 14:15 |
| 2. | "Agamemory" | 8:45 |
| 3. | "Rich Meets Max" | 20:22 |

== Personnel ==
- Klaus Schulze - synths
- Michael Garvens - voice
- Axel-Glenn Müller - saxophone
- Ulli Schober - drums
- Michael Shrieve - percussion
- Harald Katzsch - guitar
