= Totentag =

Studio album by Klaus Schulze
- Released: September 1, 1994
- Recorded: March 1992 to August 1993
- Genre: Electronic music, space music, opera
- Length: 103:42
- Label: ZYX
- Producer: Klaus Schulze

Klaus Schulze chronology
Goes Classic (1994)	Totentag (1994)	Das Wagner Desaster Live (1994)

Professional ratings
Review scores
Source	Rating
Allmusic	4/5 stars

Totentag is an electronic opera and the twenty-ninth album by Klaus Schulze. It was originally released in 1994; its libretto is inspired by the last days of the expressionist poet Georg Trakl. This is the seventh and last of the early-1990s Klaus Schulze albums not to be reissued by Revisited Records. Totentag was released after Schulze's Silver Edition 10-disc CD box set, technically making this album his thirty-ninth.

== Track listing ==
All tracks composed by Klaus Schulze.

Disc 1

No.	Title	Length
1.	"Prelude/Apotheke "Zum weißen Engel""	17:32
2.	"Liebesszene"	13:46
3.	"Im Bordell"	14:02
4.	"Das Leere Theater"	13:53

Disc 2

No.	Title	Length
1.	"In Venedig"	12:10
2.	"Grodek"	7:31
3.	"Der Freitod"	24:47
