= Innovative Communication =

German record label

- Founded: 1978; 47 years ago
- Founder: Klaus Schulze, Michael Haentjes
- Genre: Various (predominantly electronic music)
- Country of origin: Germany

Innovative Communication (IC for short, and from 1990 IC/DigItMusic, GmbH.) was a German record label founded in 1978 by musician and electronic soloist Klaus Schulze and music journalist Michael Haentjes (later CEO of Edel AG).

The abbreviation IC stood for "Independent Composers" during the founding period, but was changed to "Innovative Communication" when the IC studio (sound and video) was established in Winsen/Aller starting in 1979.
