= Are You Sequenced? =

Studio album by Klaus Schulze
- Released: September 27, 1996
- Recorded: Disc 1 April 27, 1996 Disc 2 1993
- Genre: Electronic music, space music, trance music
- Length: 79:56 (original); 157:31 (reissue)
- Label: WEA
- Producer: Klaus Schulze

Klaus Schulze chronology
In Blue (1995)	Are You Sequenced? (1996)	Dosburg Online (1997)

Are You Sequenced? is the thirty-second album by Klaus Schulze. It was originally released in 1996, and in 2006 was the eighteenth Schulze album reissued by Revisited Records. Are You Sequenced? was released after Schulze's Silver Edition and Historic Edition 10-disc CD box sets, technically making this album his fifty-second.

== Track listing ==
All tracks composed by Klaus Schulze.

Disc 1

No.	Title	Note	Length
1.	"Welcome to the Moog Brothers"	on original release	6:28
2.	"Vocs in the Dark I"	on original release	4:23
3.	"Vocs in the Dark II"	on original release	10:04
4.	"No Frets—No Bass"	on original release	9:39
5.	"Valle de la Luna"	on original release	9:00
6.	"Are You Sequenced?"	on original release	3:14
7.	"Moogie Baby Goes Solo"	on original release	7:18
8.	"Moldanya"	on original release	10:21
9.	"Vidanya"	on original release	2:11
10.	"The Wizard of Doz"	on original release	10:22
11.	"Are We Getting Lost?"	on original release	6:50

Disc 2

No.	Title	Note	Length
1.	"Vat Was Dat?"	reissue bonus track	77:35
