= Inter*Face =

Studio album by Klaus Schulze
- Released: 1985
- Recorded: July, August 1985
- Genre: Electronic music, space disco, space music, trance music
- Length: 48:55 (original); 75:18 (reissue)
- Label: Brain
- Producer: Klaus Schulze

Klaus Schulze chronology
Angst (1984)	Inter*Face (1985)	Dreams (1986)

Professional ratings
Review scores
Source	Rating
Allmusic	link

Inter*Face is the eighteenth album by Klaus Schulze. It was originally released in 1985, and in 2006 was the twentieth Schulze album reissued by Revisited Records. The two bonus tracks on the reissue were both previously released on Schulze's 25-disc CD box set Jubilee Edition (1997), which was later included on the 50-disc CD box set The Ultimate Edition (2000). However, a shorter version of "Nichtarische Arie" was included (as "Maxxi", 7:43).

== Track listing ==
All tracks are written by Klaus Schulze.

Side one
No.	Title	Length
1.	"On the Edge"	7:58
2.	"Colours in the Darkness"	9:12
3.	"The Beat Planante"	7:24

Side two
No.	Title	Length
4.	"Inter*Face"	24:49

2006 Revisited Records bonus tracks
No.	Title	Length
5.	"The Real Colours in the Darkness"	12:02
6.	"Nichtarische Arie"	13:47
